= Chiung-Yu Huang =

Taiwanese-American biostatistician

Chiung-Yu Huang (Chinese: 黃瓊玉) is a Taiwanese-American biostatistician whose research focuses on statistical methodology for testing the efficacy of vaccines, including survival analysis, competing risks, and recurrent event analysis. She is a professor in the Department of Epidemiology & Biostatistics at the University of California, San Francisco.

== Education and career ==
Huang studied mathematics as an undergraduate at National Tsing Hua University, earning a bachelor's degree in 1994 and a master's degree in 1996. She then went to Johns Hopkins University for graduate study in biostatistics, and completed her Ph.D. in 2002. Her dissertation, Modeling and Estimation for Recurrent Event Data with Dependent Censoring, was supervised by Mei-Cheng Wang.

She became an assistant professor in the University of Minnesota School of Public Health, but in 2004 left academia to work as a statistician at the National Institute of Allergy and Infectious Diseases. She returned to Johns Hopkins University as an associate professor in the Sidney Kimmel Comprehensive Cancer Center in 2013, also taking an affiliation in the Johns Hopkins Department of Biostatistics. She moved to the University of California, San Francisco in 2017, where she is also a member of the UCSF Helen Diller Family Comprehensive Cancer Center. She retains an adjunct appointment at the Johns Hopkins University School of Medicine.

== Recognition ==
In 2017, the National Tainan Girls' Senior High School recognized Huang as a distinguished alumna. She is a Fellow of the American Statistical Association, elected in 2018. She was Y.S. Chow Distinguished Lecturer of the Chinese Institute of Probability and Statistics in 2022. In 2025, she was named a Fellow of the Institute of Mathematical Statistics, "for outstanding contributions to statistical methodology, especially in survival analysis, longitudinal data analysis, recurrent event analysis, panel count data analysis, biased sampling, and the evaluation of vaccine efficacy trials; for excellent service to the profession through mentoring and editorial efforts".
