= Limited-stage small cell lung carcinoma =

Limited-stage Small Cell Lung Carcinoma
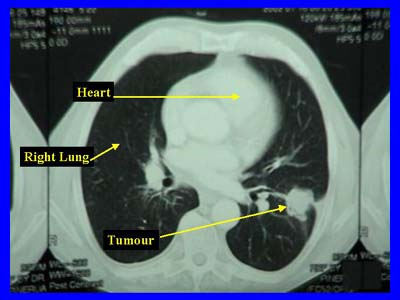
- A CT scan of limited-stage small cell lung carcinoma
- Specialty: Oncology
- Symptoms: persistent cough, chest pains, rust-coloured sputum, shortness of breath, fatigue, weight loss, wheezing, hoarseness, pneumonia, bronchitis.
- Complications: Nervous system disease
- Diagnostic method: chest x-ray, CT, biopsy
- Treatment: Surgery, chemotherapy, radiotherapy, Prophylactic cranial irradiation
- Prognosis: median overall survival time of approximately 12–16 months, with five-year survival rate of approximately 26% and the long-term survival rate of approximately 4–5%.

Limited-stage small cell lung carcinoma (LS-SCLC) is a type of small-cell lung cancer (SCLC) that is confined to an area which is small enough to be encompassed within a radiation portal. This generally includes cancer to one side of the lung and those might have reached the lymph nodes on the same side of the lung. 33% patients with small cell lung cancer are diagnosed with limited-stage small cell lung carcinoma when it is first found. Common symptoms include but are not limited to persistent cough, chest pain, rust-coloured sputum, shortness of breath, fatigue, weight loss, wheezing, hoarseness and recurrent respiratory tract infections such as pneumonia and bronchitis. Nervous system problems, Cushing syndrome and SIADH (syndrome of inappropriate anti-diuretic hormone) can also be associated with small cell lung cancer. Unlike extensive-stage small cell lung cancer, limited-stage small cell lung carcinoma is potentially curable. Standard treatments consist of surgery, platinum-based combination chemotherapy, thoracic irradiation, and prophylactic cranial irradiation. Patient five-year survival rate has significantly increased from 1% with surgery to 26% after the application of combination chemotherapy.

== Classification ==
Small cell lung cancer is often treated as a systematic disease due to its tendency for early dissemination, thus, instead of the traditional TNM staging system, the Veterans' Administration Lung Study Group (VALSG) introduced a simplified 2-stage system in the 1950s to divide small cell lung cancer into limited stage and extensive stage. As a result of the change in policy from targeting all nodal stations by radiotherapy ports to target only obviously involved nodal stations, the definition of the limited disease varies.

According to a broad medical consensus, limited-stage small cell lung carcinoma is generally considered to be encompassed within a radiation portal. Variability in categorising small-cell lung cancer as limited or extensive occurs with reference to the extent of pleural effusion and nodal stations involvement. In addition, patients with an ipsilateral pleural effusion are frequently excluded from the limited-disease category. In rare cases, patients with minimal pleural effusions are included in the limited-disease protocols; this includes those with demonstrated effusions only on chest CT, as well as those with blunting of the costophrenic angle on chest radiographs. In most cases, all patients demonstrated any positive sign of pleural effusion on any type of imaging tests are excluded.

Likewise, ambiguities in the definition of limited disease also occurs in classification of the limited disease with reference to the extent of lymphadenopathy. For instance, patients with bilateral supraclavicular adenopathy are included in the limited-disease category in some cases, others include only those with ipsilateral adenopathy. Similarly, the presence of contralateral hilar adenopathy frequently, though not uniformly, includes patients in the limited-disease category.

The traditional TNM classification system is preferred over the 2-stage system when surgery is the recommended treatment option.

== Signs and symptoms ==
Similar to other lung cancers, according to the American Cancer Society, the most common symptoms of limited-stage of lung cancer are:

- Progressive and persistent cough
- Coughing up blood or rust-coloured sputum
- Shortness of breath
- Chest pain that is often worse with deep breathing, coughing, or laughing
- Weight loss and loss of appetite
- Fatigue
- New onset of wheezing
- Recurrent respiratory tract infections such as pneumonia and bronchitis

In addition, patients diagnosed with small cell lung carcinoma has an increased vulnerability to nervous system problems (i.e. Lambert-Eaton syndrome, paraneoplastic cerebellar degeneration), Cushing syndrome and Syndrome of Inappropriate Anti-diuretic Hormone (SIADH) and can demonstrate relevant symptoms .

== Diagnosis ==
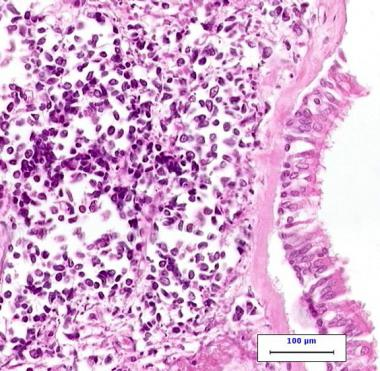
Microscopic photograph of small cell lung carcinoma under high power.

Imaging tests are often the first diagnostic step if a patient reports symptoms that may be suggestive of lung cancer. A chest x-ray is the most standard imaging test to look for any abnormality within the lung. If abnormality is present, a computed tomography (CT) scan is frequently ordered to reveal the size, shape, and position of any lung tumour and can help locate enlarged lymph nodes that might contain cancer metastasised from the lung origin. Most patients with limited-stage small cell lung cancer will receive a CT scan of the chest and abdomen to search for abnormality within the lungs and lymph nodes, as well as abnormal areas in more distal organs such as adrenal glands and liver that might arise from the metastasis of lung cancer.

For patients with limited-stage small cell lung cancer, a positron emission tomography (PET) scan is a useful diagnostic tool to investigate the extent of lymph node involvements, which can help determine treatment options.

Though results of imaging test might be suggestive of lung cancer, the actual diagnosis is made by investigating the lung cells under the microscope via lab tests. The cells can be obtained from lung secretions (sputum cytology), fluid removed from pleural effusion (thoracentesis), or from a suspicious area (needle biopsy).

== Treatment ==
The standard treatments of limited-stage small cell lung cancer are surgery, platinum-based combination chemotherapy, thoracic irradiation, and prophylactic cranial irradiation.

=== Surgery ===
Up until the late 1960s, surgical resection remained as the mainstay treatment for both limited and extensive small cell lung cancer. The principle of surgical resection in limited‐stage small cell lung carcinoma aimed to remove all viable tumors with curative intent. Consideration of surgery is recommended for Stage 1 limited-stage small cell lung cancer patient with a solitary nodule, no hilar or mediastinal involvement, absence of distant metastases, and no contraindications to surgery classified by the TNM staging system. Surgery is normally followed by chemotherapy. In cases where tumour were found in the lymph nodes, radiation therapy to the chest is usually advised after resection. The International Association for the Study of Lung Cancer (IASLC) Lung Cancer Staging Project demonstrated five‐year survival rates after resection as below:

Pathological stage	five-year survival rate
I	48%
II	39%
III	15%

=== Chemoradiotherapy ===
According to a broad medical consensus, the current standard treatment for fit patients is concurrent chemoradiotherapy. Concurrent chemoradiotherapy is a combination of chemotherapy and thoracic irradiation. To rapidly counter the fast-growing tumour, chemotherapy is often initiated first by physicians. Limited stage small cell lung cancer is sensitive to chemotherapy and a rapid response is often observed. Thoracic radiotherapy generally begins with the first or second cycle when chemotherapy is used according to most guidelines. The time between the start and the end of chemoradiotherapy is a predicator of survival in limited stage small cell lung cancer, prolongation leads to a decrease in overall survival of 1.9% per week.

Early concurrent radiochemotherapy may not be suitable for all patients. A deferred start of concurrent chemotherapy or even a sequential treatment is recommended for patients with large tumour volumes and poor fitness status. This is because early radiotherapy may increase acute and late toxicities. Depend on the size of the tumour, an increase in treatment dose may be required for large tumours, but the dosage can be reduced if initial chemotherapy shrinks the tumour to reduce late toxicities.

Concurrent chemoradiotherapy also remains the mainstay treatment for patients aged 70 years or more and showed a survival benefits when compared to sequential chemoradiotherapy.

==== Chemotherapy ====
Combined use of Cisplatin and Etoposide has become the first-line chemotherapy for limited-stage small cell lung cancer since 1980s. Carboplatin can also be used as a substitute when patient is intolerant of cisplatin. Other chemotherapy regimens including Paclitaxel and Topoisomerase I Inhibitors: Topotecan (Hycamtin) and Irinotecan (Camptosar) also reported significant response against limited-stage small-cell carcinoma during clinical trials. The optimal timing of concurrent chemoradiotherapy is during the first or second cycle. Commonly used radiation schedule and dose are either 1.5 Gy twice daily to a total of 45 Gy or 1.8–2.0 Gy daily to a total dose of 60–70 Gy.

High-dose chemotherapy using cyclophosphamide, cisplatin, and carmustine with hematologic stem-cell support or marrow support on patients aged 60 years or younger who had achieved complete or partial remission with conventional induction chemotherapy also showed significant increase in five-year survival rate to 41% - 53%.

==== Thoracic irradiation ====
Once daily radiotherapy with 66 Gy and twice-daily with 70 Gy remains two standard treatments for fit patients. Both regimens may be considered depending on the patient's preference. The treatment volume covers the primary tumour and the involved lymph nodes.

=== Prophylactic cranial irradiation ===
One of the negative impacts of thoracic radiotherapy on patients of limited-stage small cell lung carcinoma is the risk of developing brain metastasis. The risk is positively correlated with the size of tumour. Prophylactic cranial irradiation is found to be beneficial in decrease central nervous system recurrence and increase disease-free survival. The risk of brain relapse in limited-stage small cell lung carcinoma is 50% to 60% without prophylactic cranial irradiation. Administration of prophylactic cranial irradiation increased 3-year survival from 15.3% to 20.7%. Standard radiation schedule of prophylactic cranial irradiation for limited stage small cell lung cancer patients is 25 Gy delivered at 2.5 Gy per fraction per day or 30 Gy delivered at 2 Gy per fraction per day.

== Prognosis ==
Unlike extensive-stage small cell lung cancer, limited-stage small cell lung cancer is potentially curable. In limited small cell lung cancer, the median overall survival time is approximately 12–16 months, with five year survival rate of approximately 26% and long-term survival rate of approximately 4–5%.

According to multiple studies, common prognostic factors of limited stage small cell lung cancer lies in performance status, age, life expectancy, comorbidities, extent of disease and smoking. Continued cigarette smoking negatively impacts limited-stage small cell lung cancer survival. All clinicians and care providers should strongly encourage smoking cessation at the diagnosis of limited stage small cell lung cancer. Comparing to continued smokers, patients who quit at or after diagnosis lower the risk of death by 45%.
