= Treatment of lung cancer =

- Specialty: Oncology

Treatment of lung cancer refers to the use of medical therapies, such as surgery, radiation, chemotherapy, immunotherapy, percutaneous ablation, and palliative care, alone or in combination, in an attempt to cure or lessen the adverse impact of malignant neoplasms originating in lung tissue.

Lung cancer is an extremely heterogeneous family of malignant neoplasms, and well over 50 different histopathological variants are currently recognized under the most widely used typing system. Because these variants have differing genetic, biological, and clinical properties, including response to treatment, correct classification of lung cancer cases are necessary to assure that lung cancer patients receive optimum management.

Approximately 95% of lung cancers are carcinoma, or tumors derived from transformed cells of epithelial lineage. Currently, nearly four dozen different histopathological variants of lung carcinoma are recognized. For clinical and treatment purposes, however, most oncologists tend to classify lung carcinomas into two major groups, namely small cell carcinoma (SCLC) and non-small cell lung cancer (NSCLC). This is done because of differing responses to treatment—NSCLC is comparatively less sensitive to chemotherapy and/or radiation, so surgery is the treatment of choice in these tumors. SCLC, in contrast, usually initially responds well to chemotherapy and/or radiation, but has usually metastasized widely by the time it is discovered, making surgery ineffective.

In a 2010 study of patients with metastatic non–small-cell lung cancer, "early palliative care led to significant improvements in both quality of life and mood. As compared with patients receiving standard care, patients receiving early palliative care had less aggressive care at the end of life but longer survival" which was increased by approximately three months.

There are typically three objectives applied to the treatment of lung cancer and can vary by patient or individual diagnosis: (1) curing lung cancer, (2) controlling lung cancer, and (3) being comfortable.

== Surgery ==
In most cases, the goal of lung cancer surgery is to remove the entire tumor, including a small amount of normal tissue (about 2 centimetres, 0.8 in) at the margin. The general name for surgery that enters the chest is thoracotomy, and specific named types of surgical interventions may be performed as part of the thoracotomy, such as wedge resection, segmentectomy, "sleeve resection", lobectomy, or pneumonectomy, depending on the tumor and patient characteristics.

Surgery is very rarely used in cases of stage 3b or stage 4 non-small cell lung carcinoma.

== Chemotherapy ==
In patients with stage 3 lung cancer that cannot be removed, treatment with combined radiotherapy and chemotherapy improves survival significantly.

=== Chemotherapeutic Agents Used for Treatment of stage IV NSCLC ===
Chemotherapy for NSCLC usually includes combination of two drugs (chemotherapy doublet), with one of the agents is cisplatin or carboplatin. In 2002, Schiller at al. published in the New England Journal of Medicine, a study that compared four chemotherapy regimens for advanced NSCLC, cisplatin and paclitaxel, cisplatin and gemcitabine, cisplatin and docetaxel, and carboplatin and paclitaxel. The study was well powered, with 1207 patients enrolled. None of the four chemotherapy regimens offered a significant advantage over the others. In 2008, Scagliotti et al. published in the Journal of Clinical Oncology a study that compared cisplatin plus gemcitabine with cisplatin plus pemetrexed in chemotherapy-naive patients with advanced NSCLC. Overall survival was statistically superior for cisplatin/pemetrexed versus cisplatin/gemcitabine in patients with adenocarcinoma and large-cell carcinoma histology, while patients with squamous cell histology had a significant improvement in survival with cisplatin/gemcitabine versus cisplatin/pemetrexed. These two studies made significant impact on the chemotherapy choices for treating NSCLC, with cisplatin or carboplatin as the backbone of all the chemotherapy treatments protocols. Pemetrexed is provided with platinum-based chemotherapy to patients with nonsquamous NSCLC. Gemcitabine is provided with platinum-based drug to patients with squamous NSCLC.

Cisplatin
Cisplatin is composed of a central atom of platinum with two chloride atoms and two ammonia molecules attached to it. Cisplatin is provided intravenously and exerts its cell-killing effects through disrupting transcription and translation of the cell's DNA. Kidney damage (nephrotoxicity) in the form of proximal tubular injury is the main reason to stop cisplatin. Other side effects of cisplatin include nausea and vomiting which usually necessitate premedication with antiemetic medications before infusion; ear damage (ototoxicity), which could manifest in varying levels of hearing loss; peripheral neuropathy; and bone marrow suppression (myelosuppression).
Carboplatin
Carboplatin, like cisplatin, is composed of a central atom of platinum and two ammonia molecules, but it has a cyclobutanedicarboxylate moiety instead of chloride. Carboplatin is also provided intravenously and also kills cells by disrupting the cell's DNA. Bone marrow suppression is the dose-limiting toxicity of carboplatin. Carboplatin is much less damaging to kidneys compared to cisplatin and is used as an alternative to cisplatin for patients with preexisting kidney failure.
Taxanes
Taxanes are microtubule-stabilizing drugs which induces mitotic arrest at the G2/M transition phase of the cell cycle, resulting in cell death. Paclitaxel was isolated from bark extract of the Pacific yew tree. Docetaxel is a semisynthetic taxane and nab-paclitaxel is a nanoparticle albumin-bound paclitaxel.
Paclitaxel
Paclitaxel binds to tubulin and stabilizes the microtubules which leads to inhibition of cell division. Paclitaxel is provided intravenously, with a dose limiting toxicity of peripheral neuropathy. Peripheral sensory neuropathy presents with numbness and tingling in a stocking-and-glove distribution, which may disturb daily function of the patients. Hematologic toxicity include anemia, neutropenia, and less frequently thrombocytopenia.
Docetaxel
Docetaxel is provided intravenously, and acts in similar manner to paclitaxel. Docetaxel binds to tubulin, the protein component of the microtubules, and inhibits its disassembly, which results in disruption of mitosis and cell death. Hematological toxicities are the dose limiting toxicity of Docetaxel with neutropenia and anemia. Other side effects include alopecia, stomatitis, diarrhea, nausea, vomiting, fluid retention, onycholysis, and skin toxicity.
Nanoparticle Albumin-Bound Paclitaxel
Nanoparticle albumin-bound (nab) paclitaxel is an Albumin bound with high affinity to the hydrophobic molecules of paclitaxel, which results in higher accumulation of the cytotoxic drug in tumors. A recent meta-analysis showed that when compared to Paclitaxel, nab-paclitaxel has significant beneficial effects in terms of overall response rate, progression free survival, and overall survival. Side effects of nab-paclitaxel include anemia, neutropenia, alopecia, and peripheral neuropathy.
Gemcitabine
Gemcitabine is structurally similar to cytarabine and functions as a pyrimidine analogue, and blocks the progression of cells through the G1/S-phase. Gemcitabine is metabolized by nucleoside kinases to Gemcitabine diphosphate and Gemcitabine triphosphate. Gemcitabine diphosphate inhibits ribonucleotide reductase, resulting in reductions in deoxynucleotide concentrations, including deoxycytidine triphosphate. Gemcitabine triphosphate competes with deoxycytidine triphosphate for incorporation into DNA. Side effects of Gemcitabine includes myelosuppression manifested by neutropenia, thrombocytopenia, and anemia; pulmonary toxicity, including interstitial pneumonitis, pulmonary fibrosis, pulmonary edema, and adult respiratory distress syndrome; capillary leak syndrome; and posterior reversible encephalopathy syndrome.
Pemetrexed
Pemetrexed functions as an antimetabolite. Pemetrexed inhibits thymidylate synthase, dihydrofolate reductase and glycinamide ribonucleotide formyltransferase. Pemetrexed induces cell cycle arrest in the G1/S phase. Side effects of Pemetrexed includes myelosuppression, renal failure, bullous and exfoliative skin toxicity, diarrhea, nausea, and vomiting.

Tumor Treating Fields might improve chemotherapy treatment, though it is still experimental.

== Targeted therapy ==
In recent years, various molecular targeted therapies have been developed for the treatment of advanced lung cancer. Gefitinib (Iressa; withdrawn from the U.S. market) is one such drug, which targets the tyrosine kinase domain of the epidermal growth factor receptor (EGFR), expressed in many cases of non-small cell lung carcinoma. It was not shown to increase survival, although females, Asians, nonsmokers, and those with bronchioloalveolar carcinoma appear to derive the most benefit from gefitinib.

Erlotinib (Tarceva), another EGFR tyrosine kinase inhibitor, increased survival in non-small cell lung cancer and was approved by the FDA in 2004 for second-line treatment of advanced non-small cell lung carcinoma. Similar to gefitinib, it also appeared to work best in females, Asians, nonsmokers, and those with bronchioloalveolar carcinoma, particularly those with specific mutations in EGFR.

The angiogenesis inhibitor bevacizumab (Avastin), (in combination with paclitaxel and carboplatin), improves the survival of patients with advanced non-small cell lung carcinoma. However, this increases the risk of lung bleeding, particularly in patients with squamous cell carcinoma.

Crizotinib shows benefit in a subset of non-small cell lung cancer that is characterized by the EML4-ALK fusion oncogene, and is approved by the FDA. EML4-ALK is found in some relatively young, never or light smokers with adenocarcinoma.

Advances in cytotoxic drugs, pharmacogenetics and targeted drug design show promise. A number of targeted agents are at the early stages of clinical research, such as cyclo-oxygenase-2 inhibitors, the apoptosis promoter exisulind, proteasome inhibitors, bexarotene, the epidermal growth factor receptor inhibitor cetuximab, and vaccines. Sorafenib (marketed as Nexavar for use in renal and liver cancer) showed promise in a clinical trial matching targeted treatment to the cancer's genetic profile. Future areas of research include ras proto-oncogene inhibition, phosphoinositide 3-kinase inhibition, histone deacetylase inhibition, and tumor suppressor gene replacement.

== Immunotherapy ==
Immunotherapy is a type of cancer treatment that activates the immune system to fight cancer.

Nivolumab is a fully human IgG4 antibody targeting programmed death receptor 1 (PD-1). In 2015, nivolumab was approved for the treatment of people with metastatic squamous non-small cell lung cancer (NSCLC) with progression on or after platinum-based chemotherapy.

In 2016, the FDA approved atezolizumab for the treatment of people with metastatic non-small cell lung cancer (NSCLC) whose disease progressed during or following platinum-containing chemotherapy and pembrolizumab for the treatment of people with metastatic non-small cell lung cancer (NSCLC) whose tumors express programmed death-ligand 1 (PD-L1) as determined by an FDA-approved test.

In 2017, the FDA granted accelerated approval to pembrolizumab in combination with pemetrexed and carboplatin for the treatment of people with previously untreated metastatic non-squamous non-small cell lung cancer (NSCLC).

In 2018, the FDA approved durvalumab for people with unresectable stage III NSCLC whose disease has not progressed following concurrent platinum-based chemotherapy and radiation therapy.

In 2018, the FDA granted accelerated approval to nivolumab for people with metastatic SCLC with progression after platinum-based chemotherapy and at least one other line of therapy, and approved pembrolizumab in combination with pemetrexed and platinum-based antineoplastic (carboplatin or cisplatin) as first-line treatment of people with metastatic, NSCLC with no EGFR or ALK genomic tumor aberrations.

In 2018, the FDA approved pembrolizumab in combination with carboplatin and either paclitaxel or nab-paclitaxel as first-line treatment of metastatic squamous non-small cell lung cancer (NSCLC).

In 2018, the FDA approved atezolizumab in combination with bevacizumab, paclitaxel, and carboplatin for the first-line treatment of people with metastatic non-squamous, non-small cell lung cancer (NSCLC) with no EGFR or ALK genomic tumor aberrations.

In 2019, the FDA approved atezolizumab in combination with carboplatin and etoposide for the first-line treatment of adult people with extensive-stage SCLC.

In 2019, the FDA approved pembrolizumab for the first-line treatment of people with stage III non-small cell lung cancer (NSCLC) who are not candidates for surgical resection or definitive chemoradiation or metastatic NSCLC. people' tumors must have no EGFR or ALK genomic aberrations and express PD-L1 (Tumor Proportion Score [TPS] >1%) determined by an FDA-approved test.

In 2019, the FDA granted accelerated approval to pembrolizumab for people with metastatic small cell lung cancer (SCLC) with disease progression on or after platinum-based chemotherapy and at least one other prior line of therapy.

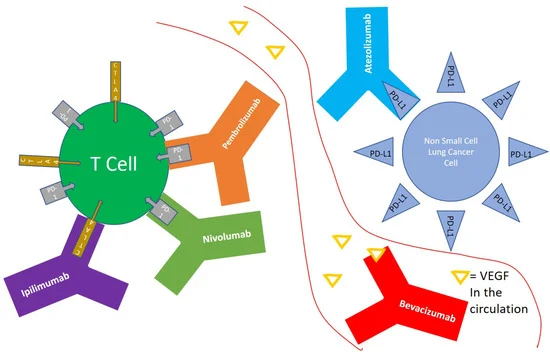
Non-small cell lung cancer (NSCLC) cells expressing programmed death-ligand 1 (PD-L1) could interact with programmed death receptor 1 (PD-1) expressed on the surface of T cells, and result in decreased tumor cell kill by the immune system. Atezolizumab is an anti PD-L1 monoclonal antibody. Nivolumab and Pembrolizumab are anti PD-1 monoclonal antibodies. Ipilimumab is a monoclonal antibody that targets Cytotoxic T-lymphocyte-associated protein 4 (CTLA-4) on the surface of T cells. Bevacizumab is a monoclonal antibody that targets Vascular Endothelial Growth Factor (VEGF) in the circulation and functions as an angiogenesis inhibitor.

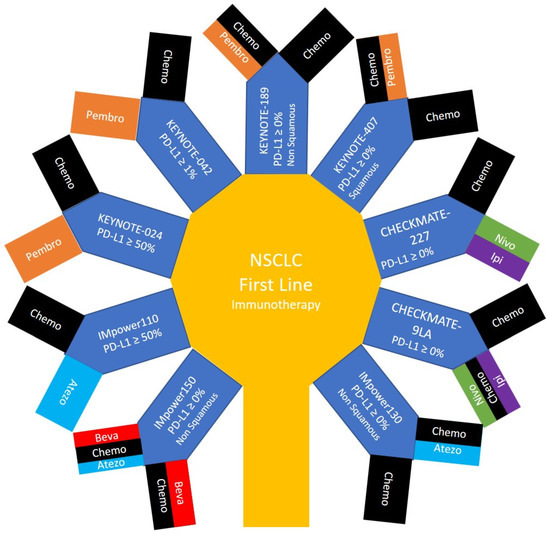
The main treatment arms of phase 3 clinical trials providing immunotherapy in the first line for patients with non-small cell lung cancer. Nivolumab (Nivo), Pembrolizumab (Pembro), atezolizumab (Atezo), Bevacizumab (Beva), Ipilimumab (Ipi). Pharmaceuticals (Basel). 2020 13(11):373.https://doi.org/10.3390/ph13110373

In 2021, the FDA approved amivantamab as the first treatment for patients with metastatic non-small cell lung cancer with epidermal growth factor receptor exon 20 insertion mutation.

The first line treatment of advanced/metastatic NSCLC can incorporates immunotherapy either as a single modality or with chemotherapy. Patients with PD-L1 ≥ 50% have multiple immunotherapy treatment options. Pembrolizumab monotherapy is an appealing approach for these patients, with median OS of 30 months with pembrolizumab single agent compared to 14.2 months with chemotherapy in KEYNOTE-024. Atezolizumab for first-line treatment of metastatic NSCLC with PD-L1 ≥ 50% was approved recently by the FDA, after the IMPOWER110 trial showed a median OS of 20.2 months for patients in the atezolizumab arm, compared with 13.1 months in the chemotherapy arm (p = 0.0106). For patients with tumor PD-L1 expression level of 1–49%, monotherapy with pembrolizumab as per KEYNOTE-042 is an appealing option, especially for smoker males.

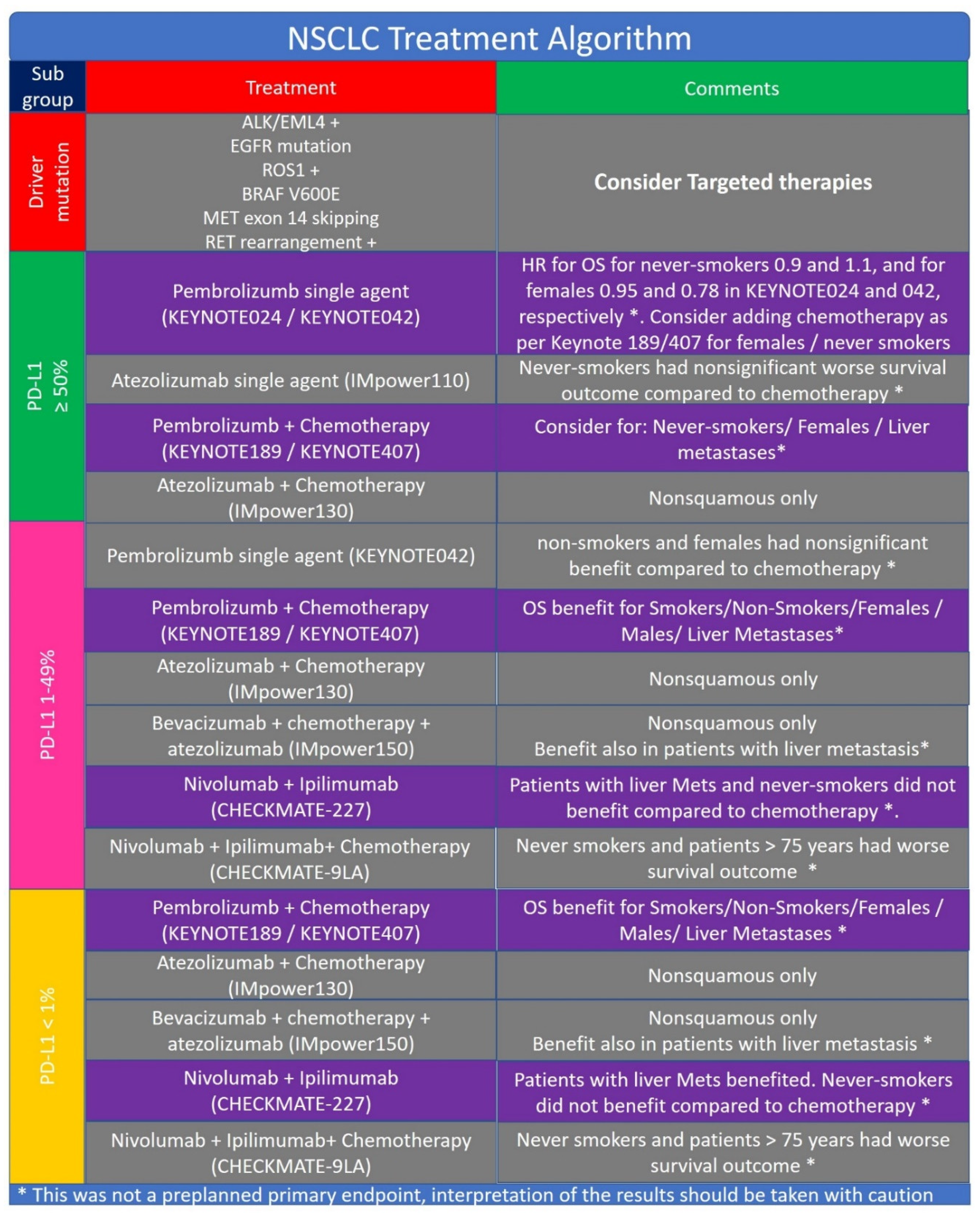
Treatment of patients with metastatic non-small cell lung cancer (NSCLC). First line Immunotherapy for Non-Small Cell Lung Cancer.

Atezolizumab/hyaluronidase (Tecentriq Hybreza) was approved for medical use in the United States in September 2024.

== Keynote-024 ==
Keynote-024 was a phase 3 trial that compared Pembrolizumab versus platinum-based chemotherapy-doublet for PD-L1 positive NSCLC. The chemotherapy used was the investigator’s choice of platinum-based chemotherapy doublet. The trial included patients with squamous (18%) and nonsquamous (82%) histology with PD-L1 expression on at least 50% of tumor cells. Most patients were current or former smokers (92%). Median overall survival (OS) was 30.0 months with pembrolizumab and 14.2 months with chemotherapy, hazard ratio 0.63, p = 0.002. Pembrolizumab was associated with significantly fewer adverse events than was platinum-based chemotherapy.

== Keynote-042 ==
KEYNOTE-042 included NSCLC patients with locally advanced or metastatic disease without previous treatment and without a driving mutation in EGFR or ALK translocation, and with PD-L1 tumor proportion score (TPS) of 1% or greater. The trial included patients with squamous and nonsquamous histology, most of them current or former smokers. This phase 3 trial compared Pembrolizumab versus the investigator’s choice of platinum-based chemotherapy doublet. Median overall survival was 16.7 months with Pembrolizumab and 12.1 months with chemotherapy, hazard ratio 0.81, p = 0.0018.

== Keynote-189 ==
This study compared chemotherapy to chemotherapy and pembrolizumab in patients with nonsquamous NSCLC as first line therapy. The chemotherapy used was Pemetrexed + Cisplatin/Carboplatin. Among patients with nonsquamous NSCLC with any PD-L1 expression level, overall survival was 22 versus 10.7 months with Pembrolizumab and chemotherapy compared to chemotherapy alone, HR 0.56.

== Keynote-407 ==
Keynote-407 compared chemotherapy to chemotherapy and pembrolizumab in patients with squamous NSCLC as first line therapy. The chemotherapy used was Carboplatin + paclitaxel or nab–paclitaxel. Among patients with squamous NSCLC with any PD-L1 expression level, OS was 15.9 versus 11.3 months with Pembrolizumab and chemotherapy compared to chemotherapy alone, respectively, HR 0.64. More than 92% of the patients were current or former smokers.

== IMpower110 ==
IMpower110 randomized patients with stage IV NSCLC with PD-L1 expression ≥ 1% to Atezolizumab single agent or to chemotherapy. The chemotherapy used was Cisplatin or Carboplatin, combined with Gemcitabine for patient with squamous cell NSCLC, or pemetrexed for patients with nonsquamous disease. Atezolizumab was better tolerated than chemotherapy. In the subgroup of patients with EGFR and ALK wild-type tumors who had PD-L1 stained ≥ 50% of tumor cells (205 patients), the OS was 20.2 months with Atezolizumab, and 13.1 months with chemotherapy.

IMpower150

IMpower150 randomized patients with nonsquamous NSCLC to treatment with chemotherapy plus Bevacizumab, chemotherapy plus atezolizumab or chemotherapy plus Bevacizumab and atezolizumab. The chemotherapy used was Carboplatin, and Paclitaxel. Median OS was 19.8 and 14.9 months for patients treated with chemotherapy plus Bevacizumab, with or without atezolizumab, respectively. Median OS with Atezolizumab and chemotherapy alone was 19.5 months, raising question with regard to the added value of Bevacizumab to this combination for the general patients population.

Survival outcomes for stage 4 non-small lung cancer patients treated with immunotherapy alone or combined with chemotherapy in the first line:

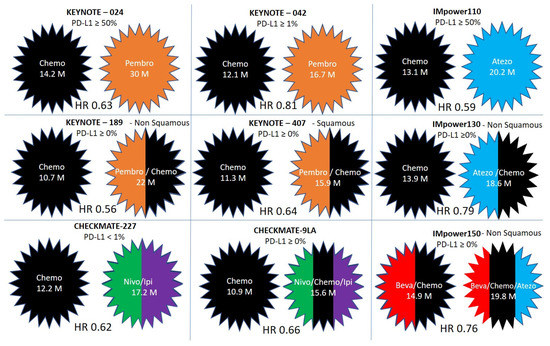
Overall survival in non-small lung cancer patients treated with immunotherapy and/or chemotherapy in the first line for advanced or metastatic disease. Results of the main treatment arms of phase 3 clinical trials. pembrolizumab (Pembro), Nivolumab (Nivo), Atezolizumab (Atezo), Bevacizumab (Beva), Ipilimumab (Ipi), Chemotherapy (Chemo), Months (M), Hazard Ratio (HR). Source: First line Immunotherapy for Non-Small Cell Lung Cancer, Nasser NJ, Gorenberg M, Agbarya A. Pharmaceuticals (Basel). 2020 13(11):373.https://doi.org/10.3390/ph13110373

== Radiation ==
In patients with stage one or two non-small cell lung carcinoma, radiotherapy alone results in 13–39% of patients surviving to five years.

== Percutaneous ablation ==
Percutaneous image-guided ablation is a minimally invasive treatment that can be offered to patients with early stage NSCLC or for palliative treatment for patients with metastatic disease. There are various types of ablation used for treating lung malignancies including radiofrequency ablation (RFA), cryoablation, and microwave ablation. Thermal ablation is typically recommended for patients who are higher risk surgical patients due to cardiopulmonary disease. Ablation is generally a lower risk procedure compared to surgery; it requires only local anesthesia and sometimes conscious sedation, and it is minimally invasive. The procedure is performed by interventional radiology in an outpatient setting. Under CT or ultrasound guidance, a probe is advanced through the anesthetized skin until the tip of the probe is positioned within the tumor. Extreme temperature is then created through electrical current (radiofrequency ablation and microwave ablation) or gas (cryoablation), which triggers destruction of the cancerous cells. Major complications are uncommon, but include partial collapse of the lung and hemothorax. While there is growing evidence supportive of ablation as treatment for NSCLC, high rates of local recurrence and new metastatic disease in the treatment areas leads to reliance on more traditional treatment modalities. The pitfalls of ablation stem from the lack of complete and homogenous destruction of tumor cells, often leading to residual malignant cells on the periphery of the tumor. For that reason, lesions greater than 5 centimetres (2.0 in) should be excluded, and lesions 3 to 5 cm (1.2 to 2.0 in) should be considered with caution, given high risk of recurrence. Additionally, for safety reasons, lesions less than 1 cm (3/8 in) from the trachea, main bronchi, esophagus and central vessels should be excluded from RFA, given high risk of complications and frequent incomplete ablation. An animal tumor model demonstrated improved survival after combined treatment with RFA and radiation therapy compared to either treatment alone. It is possible that the two modalities have a synergistic effect and patients may benefit from combined treatment.

== History ==
Prior to the early part of the 20th century lung cancer was considered a very rare disease, and all malignant lung tumors were treated identically. Radical surgical resection (i.e. lobectomy or pneumonectomy) was the only effective intervention available for lung cancer prior to the 1940s, when the era of modern cytotoxic chemotherapy began.

Palliative radiotherapy has been used since the 1940s. Radical radiotherapy, initially used in the 1950s, was an attempt to use larger radiation doses in patients with relatively early-stage lung cancer, but who were otherwise unfit for surgery. With SCLC, initial attempts in the 1960s at surgical resection and radical radiotherapy were unsuccessful.

It was not until 1962 that small cell lung carcinoma (SCLC), then called "oat cell carcinoma" was recognized for its unique biological behavior, including a much higher frequency of widespread metastases at presentation, and exquisite sensitivity to cytotoxic chemotherapy and radiation.

Early studies suggested that patients with small cell lung carcinoma (SCLC) fared better when treated with chemotherapy and/or radiation than when treated surgically. While this approach to treating SCLC remains the current standard of care, the role of surgery in SCLC is being re-examined, with recent studies indicating that surgery may improve outcomes in some patients with early stage SCLC and combined forms of SCLC and NSCLC.

== Trials ==
Squalamine is undergoing trials for treatment of non-small cell lung cancer (stage I/IIA).

In December 2012, Merck published the results of its current study. Although the Phase III Trial of L-BLP25 (Stimuvax) did not meet satisfying primary endpoints for patients with Non-Small Cell Lung Cancer, notable treatment effects have been observed for L-BLP25 in certain subgroups in the START study.

In 2023 the American Society of Clinical Oncology announced a new pill that cut the risks of a patient dying from lung cancer by over 50%. The comprehensive study was conducted with patients between the ages of 30 and 86 in 26 different countries. Researchers on the project from the Yale School of Medicine believed that the treatment could become the standard of care for lung cancer patients.

== Funding of Research ==
From 2003-2014, a study conducted by the Global Lung Cancer Coalition found that the total number of articles published in independent journals regarding lung cancer treatment research only increased ~1%. Money that is put forth for cancer research by taxpayers is generally misplaced into organizations such as the American Cancer Society rather than going to organizations that are specifically focused on a specific type of cancer. While lung cancer is the deadliest cancer, a stigma surrounds the disease that it is highly preventable by not smoking. Lung cancer receives much less press time then other cancers such as breast cancer due to this stigma. This stigma has resulted in less time and money being put into treatment research and focusing more so on smoking prevention, despite lung cancer having a multitude of other causes such as genetics or air pollution. Governing bodies place taxpayer funds into generalized organizations and the public focuses less heavily on the disease, resulting in less research into treatment.
