= Ectopia (medicine) =

Displacement or malposition of an organ or other body part

An ectopia (/ɛkˈtoʊpiə/) is a displacement or malposition of an organ or other body part, which is then referred to as ectopic (/ɛkˈtɒpɪk/).

== Examples ==
- Ectopic ACTH syndrome, also known as small-cell carcinoma.
- Ectopic calcification, a pathologic deposition of calcium salts in tissues or bone growth in soft tissues
- Cerebellar tonsillar ectopia, a.k.a. Chiari malformation, a herniation of the brain through the foramen magnum, which may be congenital or caused by trauma.
- Ectopic cilia, a hair growing where it isn't supposed to be, commonly an eyelash on an abnormal spot on the eyelid, distichia
- Ectopia cordis, the displacement of the heart outside the body during fetal development
- Ectopic enamel, a tooth abnormality, where enamel is found in an unusual location, such as at the root of a tooth
- Ectopic expression, the expression of a gene in an abnormal place in an organism
- Ectopic hormone, a hormone produced by a tumor, such as small-cell carcinoma, can cause Cushing's syndrome
- Ectopia lentis, the displacement of the crystalline lens of the eye
- Neuronal ectopia
- Ectopic pancreas, displacement of pancreatic tissue in the body with no connection, anatomical or vascular, to the pancreas
- Ectopic recombination, the recombination between sequences (like leu2 sequences) present at different genomic locations
- Renal ectopia occurs when both kidneys are on the same side of the body
- Ectopic testis, a testis that has moved to an unusual location
- Ectopic thymus, where thymus tissue is found in an abnormal location
- Ectopic thyroid, where an entire or parts of the thyroid are located elsewhere in the body
- Ectopic tooth, a tooth that erupted outside the dental arch
- Ectopic ureter, where the ureter terminates somewhere other than the urinary bladder
- Ectopia vesicae, a congenital anomaly in which part of the urinary bladder is present outside the body

== See also ==
- Ectopic beat of the heart
- Cervical ectropion
- Ectopic pregnancy, where the fertilized egg implants anywhere other than the uterine wall
- Heterotopia (medicine)
