= Yanqing Sun =

Chinese-American biostatistician

Yanqing Sun is a Chinese and American biostatistician. Her research interests include survival analysis, recurrent event analysis, relative survival, and longitudinal data, applied to problems including the effectiveness of HIV vaccines. She is a professor of statistics in the Department of Mathematics and Statistics at the University of North Carolina at Charlotte.

== Education and career ==
Sun majored in mathematics at the Wuhan University of Technology, receiving a bachelor's degree there in 1982, and she received a master's degree in applied mathematics in 1985 from the Huazhong University of Science and Technology. From 1985 to 1987 she worked as an instructor at the East China Institute of Technology. She completed a Ph.D. in statistics in 1992 from Florida State University. Her doctoral dissertation, Transfomations of Certain Gaussian Random Fields, with Applications in Survival Analysis, was supervised by Ian McKeague.

After postdoctoral research at the University of Rochester, she joined UNC Charlotte as an assistant professor in 1994; she also worked as a statistician at the Centers for Disease Control and Prevention from 1995 to 1996. In 2000 she was promoted to associate professor and in 2005 she was promoted to full professor.

== Recognition ==
Sun became an Elected Member of the International Statistical Institute in 2007, and a Fellow of the American Statistical Association in 2013.
