= Jing Ning =

Chinese-American biostatistician

Jing Ning is a Chinese-American professor of biostatistics at the MD Anderson Cancer Center of the University of Texas. Her research interests include biomarkers, semiparametric models in survival analysis, inference with length-biased data, and their applications in modeling the health of cancer patients.

== Education and career ==
Ning studied statistics at the University of Science and Technology of China, earning a bachelor's degree in 1999 and a master's degree in 2002. She completed a Ph.D. in biostatistics at Johns Hopkins University in 2007. Her dissertation, Estimating causal treatment effects for post-randomization marker data with failure event censoring, was supervised by Mei-Cheng Wang.

She joined the MD Anderson Cancer Center as a postdoctoral researcher from 2007 to 2009, and was an assistant professor in the UTHealth School of Public Health of the University of Texas from 2009 to 2011 before returning to the MD Anderson Cancer Center as a faculty member.

== Recognition ==
Ning is a Fellow of the American Statistical Association, elected to the 2023 class of fellows.
