= Mean survival =

Mean survival may refer to:

- Mean survival rate in percentage
- Mean survival time in e.g. years
