= Ectopic thymus =

Growth of thymus tissue elsewhere in the body

- Specialty: Otorhinolaryngology
- Symptoms: neck mass, sometimes hoarse voice, stridor, shortness of breath, dysphagia
- Causes: embryological defect of movement of thymus tissue
- Diagnostic method: ultrasound, magnetic resonance imaging
- Differential diagnosis: thyroglossal cyst, branchial cleft cyst, dermoid cyst, lymphadenitis, tumours
- Treatment: surgery if symptoms, watch and wait if no symptoms
- Prognosis: good
- Frequency: unknown

Ectopic thymus is a condition where thymus tissue is found in an abnormal location (ectopia). It usually does not cause symptoms, but may lead to a mass in the neck that may compress the trachea and the esophagus. It is thought to be the result of either a failure of descent or a failure of involution of normal thymus tissue. It may be diagnosed with radiology, such as an ultrasound or magnetic resonance imaging. It can be surgically removed if it causes illness. Recurrence after surgery is very unlikely.

== Signs and symptoms ==
Ectopic thymus most often does not cause symptoms. It is most frequently discovered as a soft mass or swelling in the neck of infants and children. However, when symptoms do occur they are most commonly due to compression of nearby structures such as the trachea and esophagus. This can lead to hoarse voice, stridor, difficulty breathing and/or difficulty swallowing. Pain is uncommon.

== Cause ==
During embryological development, the thymus is formed from the third and fourth pharyngeal pouches. It descends along a pathway from the mandible to its final resting place of the mediastinum. When the thymus tissue fails to descend appropriately or fails to involute, thymus tissue remains in various locations along this pathway. Locations that solid thymus tissue has been reported include near the thyroid (most common), within the thyroid, the base of the skull, and within the pharynx or trachea.

== Diagnosis ==
Ultrasound is the recommended diagnostic modality used to diagnose cervical ectopic thymus. The thymus has a unique appearance on ultrasound, which allows for specific diagnosis. Ectopic thymus appears hypoechoic, with characteristic linear echogenic foci. Magnetic resonance imaging may be utilized as well to better characterize and identify the location of the ectopic thymus. On MRI, ectopic cervical thymus appears as a homogeneous mass which is isointense to muscle on T1-weighted scans and hyperintense on T2-weighted scans. Biopsy or histological examination upon resection can also be used to make a definitive diagnosis. Sometimes, ectopic thymus is found incidentally during neck surgery.

=== Differential diagnosis ===
An appropriate differential diagnosis depends upon location of the ectopic thymus. For cervical ectopic thymus, the differential diagnosis should include additional causes of neck masses. This includes common causes of neck masses in children, including:

- thyroglossal duct cyst.
- branchial cleft cyst.
- dermoid cyst.
- inflammatory lymphadenitis.
- salivary gland infection.
- sternocleidomastoid tumor of infancy.
- benign tumor.

Rare causes of neck masses in children include:

- thyroid cancer.
- lymphoma.
- rhabdomyosarcoma.
- thyroid nodules.

== Treatment ==
If the patient is asymptomatic and the mass is identified based upon radiologic findings, biopsy and/or resection may be avoided. Surgical removal of the mass is the definitive treatment for ectopic thymus tissue that is causing symptoms. It has been reported that the ectopic thymus tissue can transform into cancerous tissue. However, due to most diagnosed ectopic thymus tissue being resected due to this concern, the natural progression is not well explored. The data supporting malignant transformation is limited, and ectopic thymus tissue that is not causing problems can likely be left to involute. Given the thymus's role in the body's adaptive immune system, it should be confirmed that the patient has a mediastinal thymus prior to surgery in order to prevent the potential for future immunodeficiencies.

== Prognosis ==
Following surgical removal of the ectopic thymus, there have been no reported recurrences.

== Epidemiology ==
Because ectopic thymus usually does not cause symptoms, it is hard to determine prevalence. Ectopic thymus is rarely reported in the literature. The prevalence of ectopic thymus reportedly ranges from 1 to 90%. This variation in prevalence is largely dependent upon the method of investigation used and how extensive the workup is. With most ectopic thymus tissue being asymptomatic, it is likely the prevalence is higher than typically reported.
