= Prophylactic cranial irradiation =

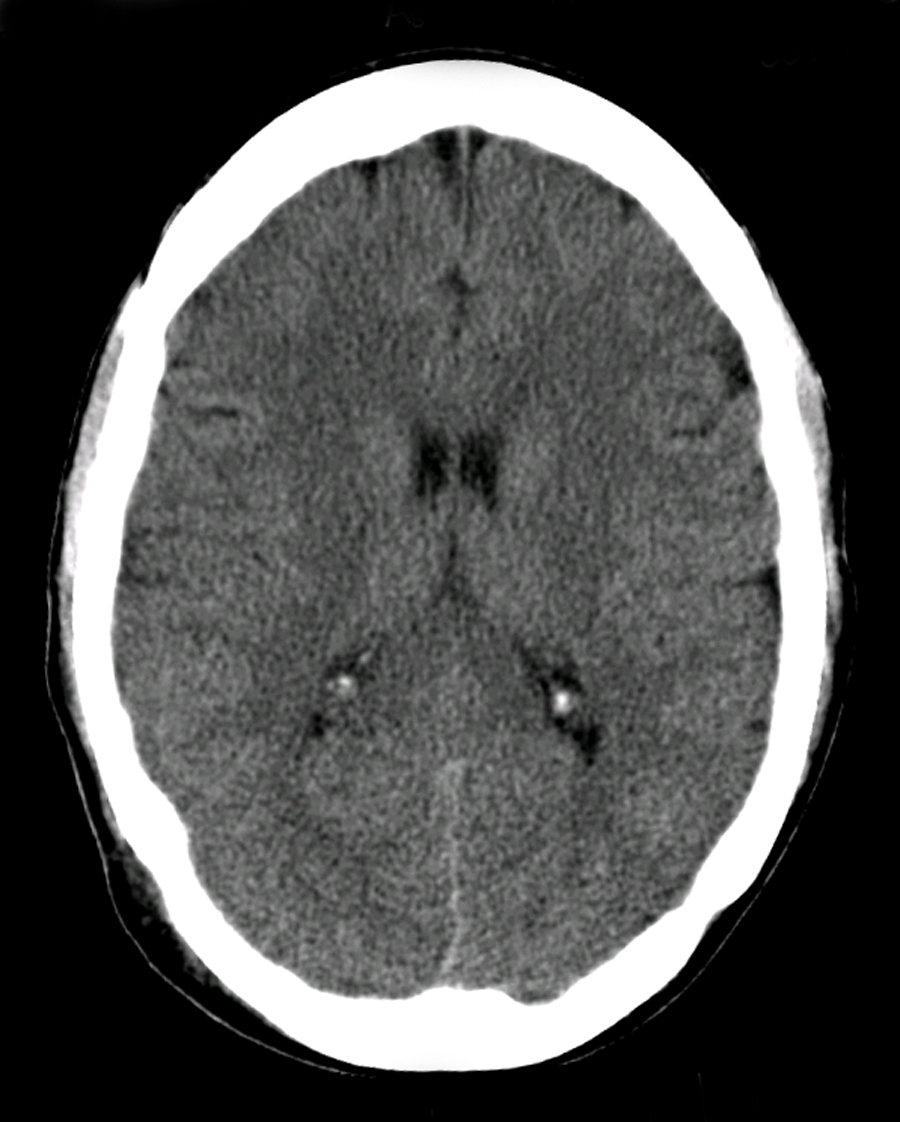
- Other names: Prophylactic cranial radiotherapy
- ICD-9-CM: 92.21

Prophylactic cranial irradiation (PCI) is a technique used to combat the occurrence of metastasis to the brain in highly aggressive cancers that commonly metastasize to brain, most notably small-cell lung cancer. Radiation therapy is commonly used to treat known tumor occurrence in the brain, either with highly precise stereotactic radiation or therapeutic cranial irradiation. By contrast, PCI is intended as preemptive treatment in patients with no known current intracranial tumor, but with high likelihood for harboring occult microscopic disease and eventual occurrence. For small-cell lung cancer with limited and select cases of extensive disease, PCI has shown to reduce recurrence of brain metastases and improve overall survival in complete remission.

== History ==
During the fervor to develop treatments for pediatric leukemia in the 1960s, there was initial experimentation with PCI for children with ALL. Although advances in chemotherapy had been able to successfully treat tumor throughout the body, there remained an alarming incidence of brain metastasis following systemic chemotherapy. A theory was developed that the brain was likely a pharmacologic sanctuary where sub-clinical metastases were protected from cytotoxic drugs by the blood–brain barrier. Oncologists hypothesized that treatment of this sub-clinical disease with radiation therapy may stamp out the malignant process before it could advance to cause symptoms. Indeed, subsequent studies showed that an increased rate of disease-free survival and overall survival in those children treated with PCI. Due to successes with pediatric blood cancers, the concept of PCI was enlisted for the treatment of other types of cancers.

Over time, there has slowly been a shift away from PCI due to incidence of long-term side effects and secondary cancers, as well as evidence of equivalent control with alternate forms of treatment such as long-term intrathecal chemotherapy. For ALL, PCI had been reserved only for high-risk cases; however, a 2009 study by Ching-Hon et al. reporting on the results of clinical trial NCT00137111 suggesting that PCI is unwarranted even in high-risk cases. Despite changing recommendations for ALL, PCI continues to play an important role in treatment of small-cell lung cancer.

=== Dosing ===
Early trials for PCI in ALL utilized high-dose treatments, up to 24 Gy cumulative dose, that resulted in significant toxicity. Further experiments showed that lower-dose treatments (12–18 Gy) administered in smaller fractions provide equivalent benefit with lower neuro-toxicity.
