= Ectopic pancreas =

Growth of pancreatic tissue outside of the pancreas

- Other names: Heterotopic pancreas, Accessory pancreas, Aberrant pancreas, Pancreatic rest, Myoepithelial hamartoma
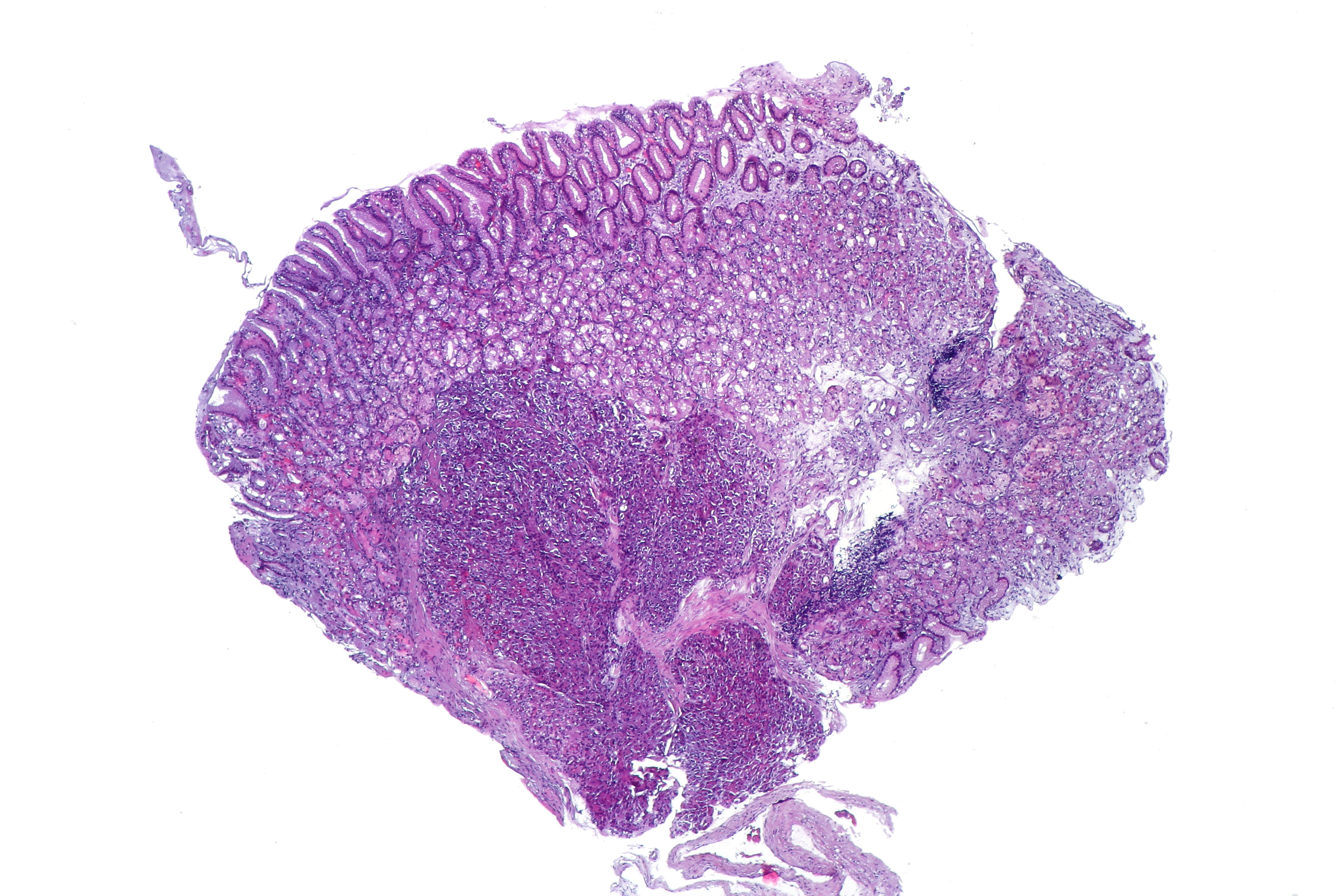
- Stomach biopsy with pancreatic heterotopia in the submucosa. H&E Stain.
- Specialty: Gastroenterology
- Symptoms: Often asymptomatic, may cause abdominal pain and distension
- Diagnostic method: Biopsy, histologic evaluation
- Differential diagnosis: Gastrointestinal stromal tumor (GIST)
- Treatment: Surgery if symptomatic
- Medication: None
- Frequency: Uncommon

An ectopic pancreas is an anatomical abnormality in which pancreatic tissue has grown outside its normal location (ectopia) and without vascular or other anatomical connections to the pancreas. It is a disease which is congenital and is also known as heterotopic, accessory, or aberrant pancreas.

== Signs and symptoms ==
Often, heterotopic pancreas is asymptomatic. When present, symptoms may include abdominal pain and distension. Heterotopic pancreas is commonly recognized as an incidental finding on imaging studies performed for an unrelated reason.

Ectopic pancreatic tissue may occur anywhere in the abdominal cavity, though more than 90 percent are found in the stomach,

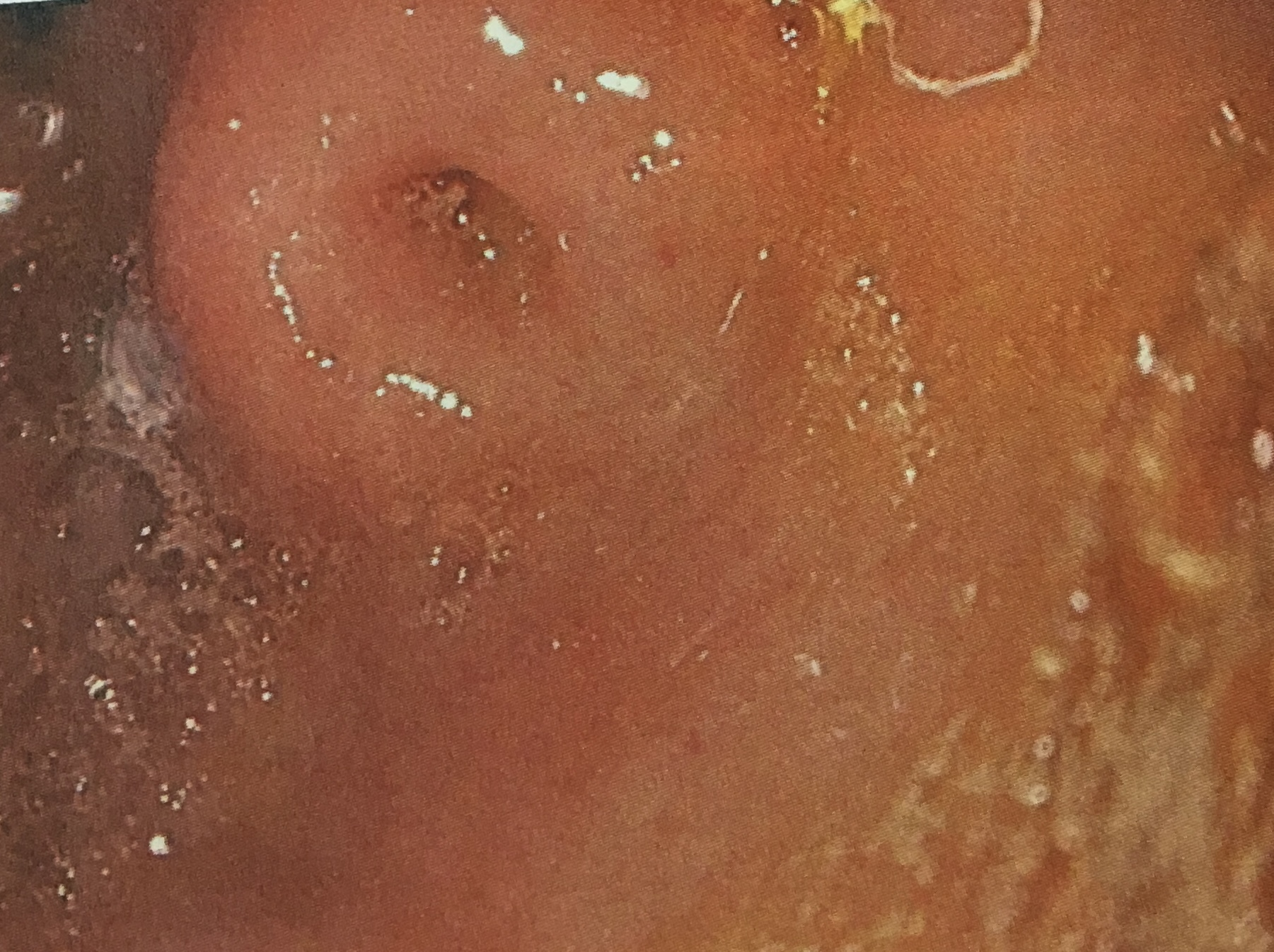
Pancreatic rest in gastric antrum

duodenum, or jejunum. It usually appears as a smooth or umbilicated nodule. Rarely, pancreatic heterotopic tissue may be found in the colon, spleen or liver.

== Diagnosis ==
The diagnosis of ectopic pancreas can be challenging. Confirmation of the diagnosis requires tissue sampling, via biopsy or surgical resection.

== Treatment ==
If no symptoms are present, then treatment is not necessary. When symptoms are present, treatment consists of surgical resection.

== Epidemiology ==
The incidence of heterotopic pancreas is relatively low.
