= Ectopic testis =

Malposition of a testicle

- Specialty: Urology

Ectopic testis is used to describe the testis leaving the inguinal canal and entering a site other than the scrotum (ectopia). Usually, it results from obstruction of the scrotal entrance or from overdevelopment and lengthening of a segment of the gubernaculum.

The positions of the ectopic testis may be: in the lower part of the abdomen, front of the thigh, femoral canal, skin of the penis, or behind the scrotum. The testis is usually developed, and accompanied by an indirect inguinal hernia. It may be divorced from the epididymis which may lie in the scrotum.

== Signs and symptoms ==
The ectopic testis can be in the perineal region, the opposite side of the scrotum, the suprapubic region, the femoral region, or the superficial inguinal pouch.

The ectopic testis is initially normal, but if it is ignored after childhood, it may become small and soft, with spermatogenesis arresting and interstitial cell proliferation occurring.

Ectopic testes are prone to malignancy, epididymo-orchitis, infertility, testicular torsion, and trauma.

== Causes ==
There is debate regarding the etiopathogenesis of ectopic testis. It could be caused by local mechanical barriers obstructing the normal descent, aberrant gubernacular stabilization as a result of an anomaly at its distal end, or aberrant interaction between androgen and calcitonin gene-related peptide (CGRP).

== Diagnosis ==
Diagnosis can be made based on the presence of an empty scrotum and swelling in the perineal area. Diagnosis can also be aided by palpation of the testis. Imaging methods like tomography and ultrasound might be necessary on occasion.

== Treatment ==
The treatment of choice for ectopic testis is orchiopexy.

== See also ==
- Cryptorchidism
- Orchiopexy
