= Atezolizumab/hyaluronidase =

Combination medication

Combination of
- Atezolizumab: Monoclonal antibody
- Hyaluronidase: Endoglycosidase

Clinical data
- Trade names: Tecentriq Hybreza
- AHFS/Drugs.com: Tecentriq-hybreza
- MedlinePlus: a624074
- License data: US DailyMed: Atezolizumab and hyaluronidase
- Routes of administration: Subcutaneous
- ATC code: None

Legal status
- Legal status: US: ℞-only

Atezolizumab/hyaluronidase, sold under the brand name Tecentriq Hybreza, is a fixed-dose combination medication used for the treatment of non-small cell lung cancer, small cell lung cancer, hepatocellular carcinoma, melanoma, and alveolar soft part sarcoma. It contains atezolizumab, a programmed death-ligand 1 (PD-L1) blocking monoclonal antibody; and hyaluronidase (human recombinant), an endoglycosidase. It is taken by subcutaneous injection.

The most common adverse reactions include fatigue, musculoskeletal pain, cough, dyspnea, and decreased appetite.

Atezolizumab/hyaluronidase was approved for medical use in the United States in September 2024.

== Medical uses ==
Atezolizumab/hyaluronidase is a subcutaneous injection version of atezolizumab for all the adult indications as the intravenous formulation of atezolizumab including non-small cell lung cancer, small cell lung cancer, hepatocellular carcinoma, melanoma, and alveolar soft part sarcoma.

== History ==
The subcutaneous injection of atezolizumab and hyaluronidase was evaluated in IMscin001 (NCT03735121), an open-label, multi-center, international, randomized trial in adults with locally advanced or metastatic non-small cell lung cancer who were not previously exposed to cancer immunotherapy and who had disease progression following treatment with platinum-based chemotherapy. A total of 371 participants were randomized (2:1) to receive subcutaneous atezolizumab and hyaluronidase or intravenous atezolizumab until disease progression or unacceptable toxicity.
