= Ectopic hormone =

Hormone produced by tumors

An ectopic hormone is a hormone produced by tumors derived from tissue that is not typically associated with its production.

On the other hand, the term entopic is used to refer to hormones produced by tissue in tumors that are normally engaged in the production of that hormone.

The excess hormone secretion is considered detrimental to the normal body homeostasis. This hormone production typically results in a set of signs and symptoms that are called a paraneoplastic syndrome.

Some clinical syndromes caused by ectopic hormone production include:

| Syndrome | Main causal cancers | Ectopic hormone |
|---|---|---|
| Cushing syndrome | Small-cell lung cancer; Pancreatic carcinoma; Neural tumors; Thymoma | Ectopic ACTH and ACTH-like substance |
| Syndrome of inappropriate antidiuretic hormone | Small-cell lung cancer | Ectopic Antidiuretic hormone |
| Hypercalcemia | Lung cancer (typically squamous cell); Breast carcinoma; Renal and bladder carcinoma; Multiple myeloma (may occur independent of osteolytic lesions); Adult T cell leukemia/lymphoma; Ovarian carcinoma; Squamous cell carcinoma (e.g., lung, head, neck, esophageus) | Ectopic PTHrP (Parathyroid hormone-related protein), TGF-α, TNF, IL-1 |
| Hypoglycemia | Fibrosarcoma; Hemangiopericytomas | Ectopic Insulin-like growth factor 2 |
| Hyperaldosteronism | Non-Hodgkin's lymphoma; Ovarian carcinoma; Pulmonary | Ectopic Aldosterone |
