= Atezolizumab =

Monoclonal anti-PD-L1 antibody

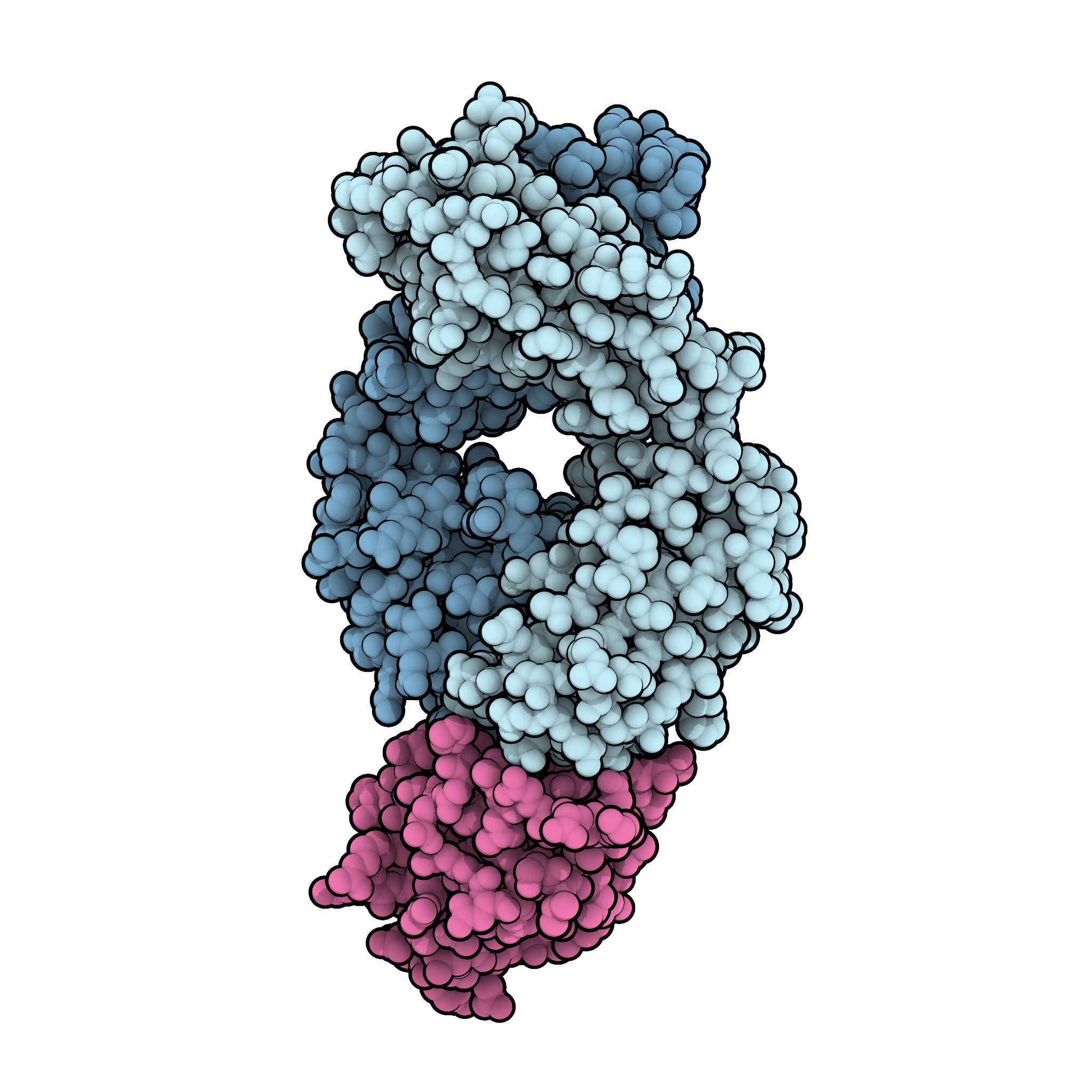
- Antigen-binding fragment of atezolizumab (blue) in complex with PD-L1 (pink). PDB: 5X8L.

Monoclonal antibody
- Type: Whole antibody
- Source: Humanized
- Target: PD-L1

Clinical data
- Trade names: Tecentriq, Tecentriq SC
- Other names: MPDL3280A, RG7446
- AHFS/Drugs.com: Monograph
- MedlinePlus: a616035
- License data: US DailyMed: Atezolizumab
- Pregnancy category: AU: D
- Routes of administration: Intravenous infusion, subcutaneous
- Drug class: Antineoplastic
- ATC code: L01FF05 (WHO)

Legal status
- Legal status: AU: S4 (Prescription only); CA: ℞-only; UK: POM (Prescription only); US: ℞-only; EU: Rx-only

Identifiers
- CAS Number: 1380723-44-3
- DrugBank: DB11595
- ChemSpider: none
- UNII: 52CMI0WC3Y
- KEGG: D10773

Chemical and physical data
- Formula: C_{6446}H_{9902}N_{1706}O_{1998}S_{42}
- Molar mass: 144612.59 g·mol^{−1}

Atezolizumab, sold under the brand name Tecentriq among others, is a monoclonal antibody medication used to treat urothelial carcinoma, non-small cell lung cancer (NSCLC), small cell lung cancer (SCLC), hepatocellular carcinoma and alveolar soft part sarcoma, but discontinued for use in triple-negative breast cancer (TNBC). It is a fully humanized, engineered monoclonal antibody of IgG1 isotype against the protein programmed cell death-ligand 1 (PD-L1).

The most common side effects when used on its own include tiredness, reduced appetite, nausea, vomiting, cough, difficulty breathing, diarrhea, rash, fever, pain in the back, joints, muscles and bones, weakness, itching and urinary tract infection. The most common side effects when used with other cancer medicines include peripheral neuropathy (nerve damage in the hands and feet), nausea, anemia (low red blood cell counts), neutropenia (low white blood cell counts), thrombocytopenia (low platelet counts), rash, tiredness, constipation, reduced appetite, diarrhea, and cough.

Atezolizumab was the first PD-L1 inhibitor approved by the US Food and Drug Administration (FDA) for bladder cancer. In the European Union, atezolizumab is the first PD-(L)1 cancer immunotherapy for subcutaneous injection. Atezolizumab is a therapeutic alternative on the World Health Organization's List of Essential Medicines.

== Medical uses ==
In the European Union, atezolizumab is indicated for the treatment of urothelial carcinoma, non-small cell lung cancer, small cell lung cancer, hepatocellular carcinoma, and triple-negative breast cancer. It is no longer indicated for triple-negative breast cancer.

In the United States, atezolizumab is indicated for the treatment of non-small cell lung cancer, small cell lung cancer, hepatocellular carcinoma, melanoma, and alveolar soft part sarcoma. Its indication for urothelial carcinoma was withdrawn in November 2022.

== Adverse effects ==
The most common adverse effects in studies were fatigue, decreased appetite, nausea and infections. Urinary tract infection was the most common severe adverse effect.

== Pharmacology ==
=== Mechanism of action ===
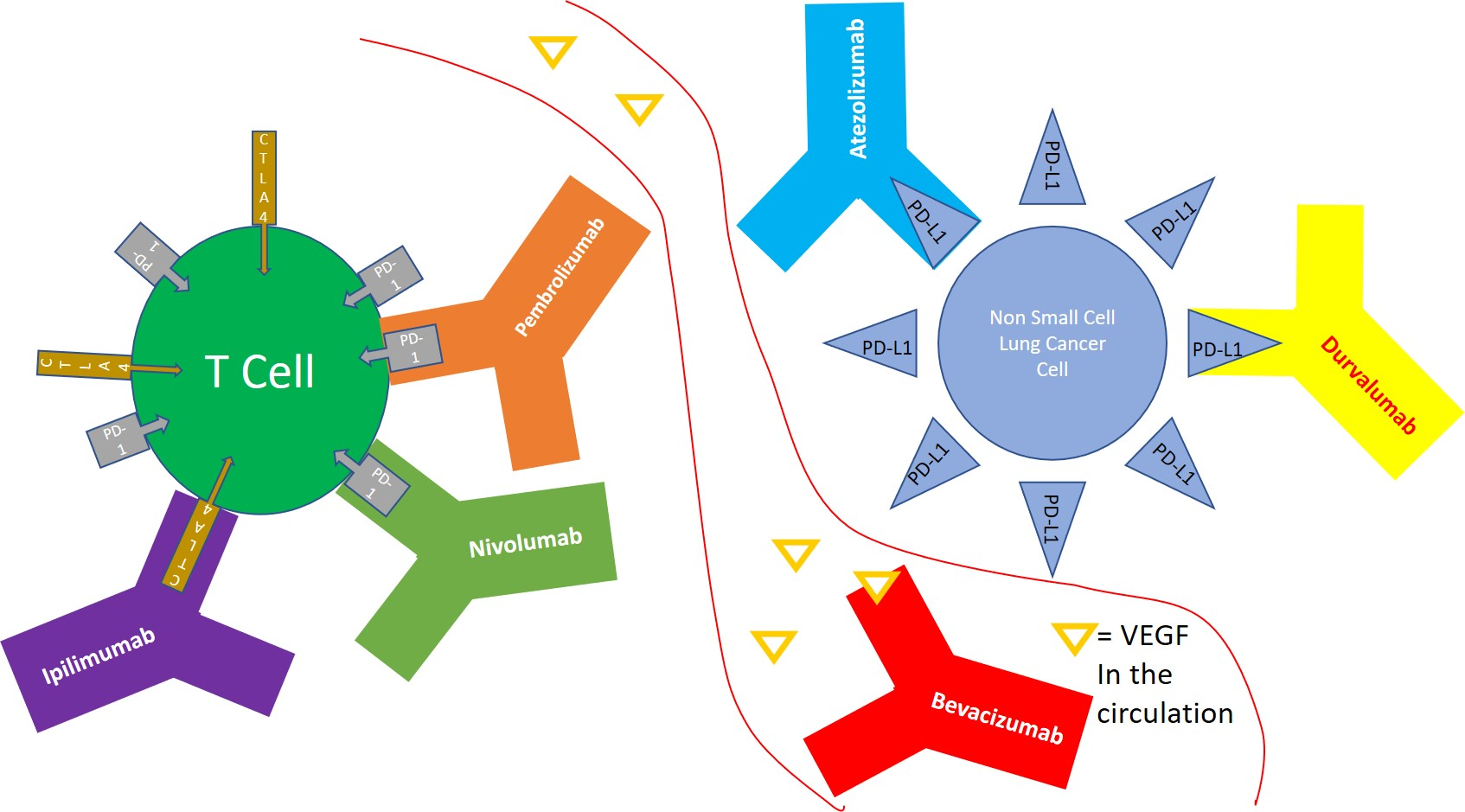
Non-small cell lung cancer (NSCLC) cells expressing programmed death-ligand 1 (PD-L1) could interact with programmed death receptor 1 (PD-1) expressed on the surface of T cells, and result in decreased tumor cell kill by the immune system. Atezolizumab is an anti PD-L1 monoclonal antibody. Nivolumab and pembrolizumab are anti PD-1 monoclonal antibodies. Ipilimumab is a monoclonal antibody that targets cytotoxic T-lymphocyte-associated protein 4 (CTLA-4) on the surface of T cells. Bevacizumab is a monoclonal antibody that targets vascular endothelial growth factor (VEGF) in the circulation and functions as an angiogenesis inhibitor. Source: First line Immunotherapy for Non-Small Cell Lung Cancer, Nasser NJ, Gorenberg M, Agbarya A. Pharmaceuticals (Basel). 2020 https://doi.org/10.3390/ph13110373

Atezolizumab blocks the interaction of PD-L1 with programmed cell death protein 1 (PD-1) and CD80 receptors (B7-1Rs). PD-L1 can be highly expressed on certain tumors, which is thought to lead to reduced activation of immune cells (cytotoxic T-cells in particular) that might otherwise recognize and attack the cancer. Inhibition of PD-L1 by atezolizumab can remove this inhibitor effect and thereby engender an anti-tumor response. It is one of several ways to block inhibitory signals related to T-cell activation, a more general strategy known as immune checkpoint inhibition.

For some cancers (notably bladder) the probability of benefit is related to PD-L1 expression, but most cancers with PD-L1 expression still do not respond, and many (about 15%) without PD-L1 expression do respond.

== History ==
In 2015, it was in clinical trials as an immunotherapy for several types of solid tumors. It was under investigation by Genentech/Roche.

In April 2016, Roche announced that atezolizumab had been granted fast track status for lung cancer by the US Food and Drug Administration (FDA).

In May 2016, the FDA granted accelerated approval to atezolizumab for locally advanced or metastatic urothelial carcinoma treatment after failure of cisplatin-based chemotherapy. The confirmatory trial (to convert the accelerated approval into a full approval) failed to achieve its primary endpoint of overall survival. In 2018, FDA altered the use of atezolizumab as a first-line treatment for metastatic bladder cancer in people who can't receive cisplatin-based chemotherapy and have high levels of PD-L1.

In May 2016, atezolizumab was approved by the FDA for the treatment of people with locally advanced or metastatic urothelial carcinoma who have disease progression during or following platinum-containing chemotherapy or have disease progression within twelve months of neoadjuvant or adjuvant treatment with platinum-containing chemotherapy. In May 2017, atezolizumab failed a phase III trial for second line bladder cancer.

The safety and efficacy of atezolizumab were studied in people with urothelial carcinoma. Tumors temporarily shrank in a minority of participants, with people being more likely to benefit if the tumor expressed PD-L1. The trial was conducted in the United States, Canada, Spain, France, Great Britain, Germany, Italy and the Netherlands.

In October 2016, atezolizumab was approved by the FDA for the treatment of people with metastatic non-small cell lung cancer (NSCLC) whose disease progressed during or following platinum-containing chemotherapy. People with EGFR or ALK genomic tumor aberrations should have disease progression on FDA-approved therapy for these aberrations prior to receiving atezolizumab.

This approval was based on two international, randomized, open-label clinical trials (OAK and POPLAR) that demonstrated consistent results in efficacy and safety in a total of 1137 participants with NSCLC. Compared with docetaxel, treatment with atezolizumab in the intended participants population in the two trials resulted in a 4.2 and a 2.9 month improvement in overall survival (OS), respectively.

Atezolizumab was approved for medical use in the European Union in September 2017.

In May 2018, the use of atezolizumab in combination with bevacizumab (Avastin) and standard chemotherapy for some people with lung cancer was granted priority review.

In August 2018, the FDA updated the prescribing information for atezolizumab to require the use of an FDA-approved companion diagnostic test to determine PD-L1 levels in tumor tissue from people with locally advanced or metastatic urothelial cancer who are cisplatin-ineligible.

In September 2018, it was announced that atezolizumab prolongs survival in extensive stage SCLC treatment, according to study results presented at the 19th World Conference on Lung Cancer (WCLC) in Toronto, Canada.

In October 2018, a combined clinical trial of the drug with nab-paclitaxel on people with advanced TNBC concluded.

Atezolizumab, in combination with bevacizumab, paclitaxel, and carboplatin, was approved in the United States in December 2018, for the first-line treatment of people with metastatic non-squamous, non-small cell lung cancer (NSq NSCLC) with no EGFR or ALK genomic tumor aberrations. Approval was based on the IMpower150 trial (NCT02366143), an open-label, randomized (1:1:1), three-arm trial enrolling 1202 participants receiving first-line treatment for metastatic NSq NSCLC.

In March 2019, it was approved in the United States, in combination with paclitaxel protein-bound, for adults with unresectable locally advanced or metastatic TNBC whose tumors express PD-L1 (PD-L1 stained tumor-infiltrating immune cells [IC] of any intensity covering ≥ 1% of the tumor area), as determined by an FDA-approved test. The FDA also approved the VENTANA PD-L1 (SP142) Assay as a companion diagnostic device for selecting TNBC patients for atezolizumab.

Approval was based on IMpassion130 (NCT02425891), a multicenter, international, double-blinded, placebo-controlled, randomized trial that included 902 participants with unresectable locally advanced or metastatic TNBC who had not received prior chemotherapy for metastatic disease. Participants were randomized (1:1) to receive either atezolizumab (840 mg) or placebo intravenous infusions on days 1 and 15 of every 28-day cycle, plus paclitaxel protein-bound (100 mg/m2) administered via intravenous infusion on days 1, 8, and 15 of every 28-day cycle.

Also in March 2019, it was approved in the United States, in combination with carboplatin and etoposide, for the first-line treatment of adults with extensive-stage small cell lung cancer (ES-SCLC).

Approval was based on IMpower133 (NCT02763579), a randomized (1:1), multicenter, double-blind, placebo-controlled trial in 403 participants with ES-SCLC who received no prior chemotherapy for extensive stage disease and had ECOG performance status 0 or 1.

In December 2019, atezolizumab in combination with paclitaxel protein-bound and carboplatin was approved by the FDA for the first-line treatment of adults with metastatic non-squamous non-small cell lung cancer (NSCLC) with no EGFR or ALK genomic tumor aberrations.

Efficacy was evaluated in IMpower130 (NCT02367781), a multicenter, randomized (2:1), open-label trial in participants with stage IV non-squamous NSCLC who had received no prior chemotherapy for metastatic disease, but could have received prior EGFR or ALK kinase inhibitor, if appropriate. The trial randomized 724 participants (ITT) to either receive atezolizumab, paclitaxel protein-bound, and carboplatin, followed by single-agent atezolizumab, or to receive paclitaxel protein-bound and carboplatin, followed by maintenance pemetrexed at the investigator's discretion.

In May 2020, the atezolizumab was approved by the FDA for the first-line treatment of adults with metastatic non-small cell lung cancer (NSCLC) whose tumors have high PD-L1 expression (PD-L1 stained ≥ 50% of tumor cells [TC ≥ 50%] or PD-L1 stained tumor-infiltrating immune cells [IC] covering ≥ 10% of the tumor area [IC ≥ 10%]), with no EGFR or ALK genomic tumor aberrations.

Efficacy was evaluated in IMpower110 (NCT02409342), a multicenter, international, randomized, open-label trial in participants with stage IV NSCLC whose tumors express PD-L1 (TC ≥ 1% or IC ≥ 1%), who had received no prior chemotherapy for metastatic disease. Participants were randomized (1:1) to receive atezolizumab 1200 mg every three weeks (until disease progression or unacceptable toxicity) or platinum-based chemotherapy.

Also in May 2020, atezolizumab in combination with bevacizumab was approved by the FDA for people with unresectable or metastatic hepatocellular carcinoma who have not received prior systemic therapy.

Efficacy was investigated in IMbrave150 (NCT03434379), a multicenter, international, open-label, randomized trial in participants with locally advanced unresectable or metastatic hepatocellular carcinoma who had not received prior systemic therapy. A total of 501 participants were randomized (2:1) to receive either atezolizumab 1200 mg as an intravenous infusion (IV) followed by bevacizumab 15 mg/kg IV on the same day, every 3 weeks, or sorafenib orally twice daily.

In July 2020, it was approved in the United States, in combination with cobimetinib and vemurafenib, for the treatment of people with BRAF V600 mutation-positive unresectable or metastatic melanoma.

Efficacy in combination with cobimetinib and vemurafenib was evaluated in a double-blind, randomized (1:1), placebo-controlled, multicenter trial (IMspire150, NCT02908672) in 514 participants. After a 28-day cycle of cobimetinib and vemurafenib, participants received atezolizumab 840 mg intravenous infusion every 2 weeks in combination with cobimetinib 60 mg orally once daily and vemurafenib 720 mg orally twice daily, or placebo in combination with cobimetinib 60 mg orally once daily (21 days on/7 days off) and vemurafenib 960 mg orally twice daily.

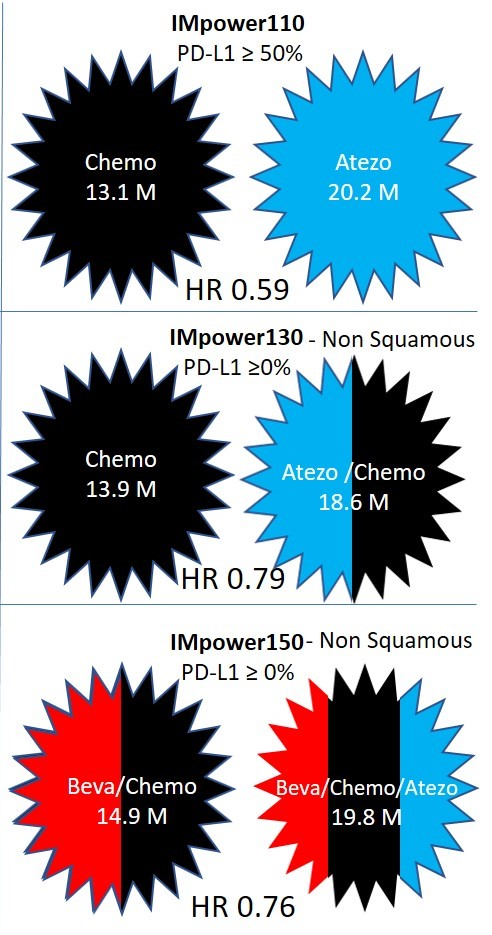
Patients median survival with atezolizumab (Atezo) for treatment of non small cell lung cancer in the first line, IMpower 110 comparing Atezo to chemotherapy, IMpower 130 comparing Atezo+chemotherapy to chemotherapy, and IMpower150 comparing Atezo+chemotherapy+bevacizumab versus chemotherapy+bevacizumab. Adapted from: First line Immunotherapy for Non-Small Cell Lung Cancer. Nicola J. Nasser, Miguel Gorenberg, Abed Agbarya. Pharmaceuticals (Basel). 2020 Nov 8;13(11):373. https://doi.org/10.3390/ph13110373

IMpower110 randomized patients with stage IV NSCLC with PD-L1 expression ≥ 1% to atezolizumab single agent or to chemotherapy. The chemotherapy used was Cisplatin or Carboplatin, combined with gemcitabine for patient with squamous cell NSCLC, or pemetrexed for patients with nonsquamous disease. Atezolizumab was better tolerated than chemotherapy. In the subgroup of patients with EGFR and ALK wild-type tumors who had PD-L1 stained ≥ 50% of tumor cells (205 patients), the overall survival was 20.2 months with atezolizumab, and 13.1 months with chemotherapy. The FDA approval is for people with PD-L1 stained ≥ 50% of tumor cells, or PD-L1 stained tumor-infiltrating immune cells covering ≥ 10% of the tumor area, with no EGFR or ALK genomic tumor aberrations.

IMpower130 was an open-label, phase III trial that compared atezolizumab in combination with carboplatin plus nab-paclitaxel chemotherapy, with chemotherapy alone as first-line treatment for metastatic non-squamous NSCLC. About half of the patients had PD-L1 negative tumors. Median overall survival was 18.6 months in the atezolizumab plus chemotherapy group and 13.9 months in the chemotherapy group; HR 0.79, p = 0.033. Subgroup analysis showed progression free survival benefit, and a trend toward overall survival benefit in all PD-L1 expression levels.

IMpower150 randomized patients with NSq NSCLC to treatment with chemotherapy plus bevacizumab, chemotherapy plus atezolizumab or chemotherapy plus bevacizumab and atezolizumab. The chemotherapy used was carboplatin and paclitaxel. Median overall survival was 19.8 and 14.9 months for patients treated with chemotherapy plus bevacizumab, with or without atezolizumab, respectively. Median OS with atezolizumab and chemotherapy alone was 19.5 months, raising question with regard to the added value of Bevacizumab to this combination for the general patients population. Importantly, patients with baseline liver metastases had an improved overall survival with atezolizumab, bevacizumab, and chemotherapy combination, compared to bevacizumab and chemotherapy alone, with a median OS of 13.3 and 9.4 months, respectively, HR 0.52. No improvement in overall survival was observed for patients with liver metastasis treated with chemotherapy and atezolizumab compared to patients treated with chemotherapy and bevacizumab. Recent report about safety and patient-reported outcomes of atezolizumab plus chemotherapy and bevacizumab shows that this drug combination seems tolerable and with manageable toxicities. For patients with NSq NSCLC with baseline liver metastases, the combination of chemotherapy, atezolizumab and bevacizumab could be an option to consider in the first line.

In August 2023, Great Britain's Healthcare Products Regulatory Agency (MHRA) approved subcutaneous atezolizumab for all indications in which the intravenous formulation of the drug has been approved, including select types of lung, bladder, breast, and liver cancers. After receiving approval NHS England stated that hundreds of patients who were treated with the immunotherapy, are set to receive "under the skin" injections of atezolizumab, which will eventually lead to more time for cancer teams.

In January 2024, the European Commission granted marketing authorization for Tecentriq SC (atezolizumab), as the first PD-(L)1 cancer immunotherapy for subcutaneous (under the skin) injection in the European Union.

In October 2025, the FDA approved a combination of atezolizumab, hyaluronidase, and lurbinectedin for the treatment of adults with extensive-stage small cell lung cancer.

== Society and culture ==
=== Economics ===
Atezolizumab treatment costs on average US$13,200 per month in the United States, depending on the dosage schedule. Despite updated data showing 30% more people with extensive stage small cell lung cancer have survived at 24 months, compared to those who received chemotherapy alone, Canadian regulators had rejected funding for atezolizumab to treat extensive stage small-cell lung cancer "as too costly" followed by United Kingdom also citing "drug's cost-effectiveness." However, the UK reversed its previous decision and approved Tecentriq for extensive stage small cell lung cancer after a price reconsideration in May 2020.
