= Five-year survival rate =

Type of survival rate

The five-year survival rate is a type of survival rate used to estimate the prognosis of a particular disease, normally calculated from the point of diagnosis. Lead time bias from earlier diagnosis can affect interpretation of the five-year survival rate. There are absolute and relative survival rates, but the latter are more useful and commonly used.

== Relative and absolute rates ==
Five-year relative survival rates are more commonly cited in cancer statistics. Five-year absolute survival rates may sometimes also be cited.

=== Absolute survival rate ===
This is the simplest of the two statistics. It is defined as the number of patients alive five years after the disease is diagnosed expressed as a percentage of the total number of patients who had initially been diagnosed.

=== Relative survival rate ===
This starts from the absolute survival rate but adjusts for the overall mortality rate of the general population. It is defined as the absolute survival rate divided by the percentage of the general population of corresponding sex and age expected to survive over the same five-year period.

Typically, cancer five-year relative survival rates are well below 100%, reflecting excess mortality among cancer patients compared to the general population. However it is possible for the relative survival rate to exceed 100% if the group of cancer patients have a higher survival rate than the general population. This pattern may occur if two conditions are both satisfied:

- most cancer patients can be cured, and
- patients diagnosed with cancer have greater socioeconomic wealth or access to medical care than the general population (or maybe the wrong age distribution etc has been used to derive the general population survival rate).

The fact that relative survival rates above 100% were estimated for some groups of patients appears counterintuitive on first view. It is unlikely that occurrence of prostate cancer would increase chances of survival, compared to the general population. A more plausible explanation is that the pattern reflects a selection effect of PSA screening, as screening tests tend to be used less often by socially disadvantaged population groups, who, in general, also have higher mortality.

== Applications ==
Five-year survival rates can be used to compare the effectiveness of treatments. Use of five-year survival statistics is more useful in aggressive diseases that have a shorter life expectancy following diagnosis, such as lung cancer, and less useful in cases with a long life expectancy, such as prostate cancer. Improvements in rates are sometimes attributed to improvements in diagnosis rather than to improvements in prognosis. To compare treatments independently from diagnostics, it may be better to consider survival from reaching a certain stage of the disease or its treatment.

Analysis performed against the Surveillance, Epidemiology, and End Results database (SEER) facilitates calculation of five-year survival rates.

== See also ==
- Prognosis – Medical term for the likely development of a disease
- Relative survival – Calculation in epidemiology
- Survival analysis – Branch of statistics
- Survival rate – Medical analysis of disease
