= Mei-Cheng Wang =

Biostatistician

Mei-Cheng Wang is a biostatistician in the Johns Hopkins Bloomberg School of Public Health. Her research includes both theoretical work on survival analysis and statistical truncation, and applications to medical questions including prenatal and infant care, AIDS infection, and kidney disease.

Wang earned a bachelor's degree in mathematics from National Tsing Hua University in 1978. She completed a master's degree in 1983 and a Ph.D. in 1985 in statistics from the University of California, Berkeley. Her dissertation, supervised by Nicholas P. Jewell, was Regression Analysis with Selection Biased Dependent Variable. She has been on the Johns Hopkins faculty since 1985.

In 1998, Wang was elected as a Fellow of the American Statistical Association. She was elected to the International Statistical Institute in 2015, and as a fellow of the Institute of Mathematical Statistics in 2017 "for influential contributions to survival analysis, including theory and application of random truncation and recurrent event processes". Also in 2017, the International Chinese Statistical Association gave her their Outstanding Service Award.
