= Survival rate =

Medical analysis of disease

Survival rate is a part of survival analysis. It is the proportion of people in a study or treatment group still alive at a given period of time after diagnosis. It is a method of describing prognosis in certain disease conditions, and can be used for the assessment of standards of therapy. The survival period is usually reckoned from date of diagnosis or start of treatment. Survival rates are based on the population as a whole and cannot be applied directly to an individual. There are various types of survival rates (discussed below). They often serve as endpoints of clinical trials and should not be confused with mortality rates, a population metric.

== Overall survival ==
Patients with a certain disease (for example, colorectal cancer) can die directly from that disease or from an unrelated cause (for example, a car accident). When the precise cause of death is not specified, this is called the overall survival rate or observed survival rate. Doctors often use mean overall survival rates to estimate the patient's prognosis. This is often expressed over standard time periods, like one, five, and ten years. For example, prostate cancer has a much higher one-year overall survival rate than pancreatic cancer, and thus has a better prognosis.

Sometimes the overall survival is reported as a death rate (%) without specifying the period the % applies to (possibly one year) or the period it is averaged over (possibly five years), e.g. Obinutuzumab: A Novel Anti-CD20 Monoclonal Antibody for Chronic Lymphocytic Leukemia.

== Net survival rate ==
When someone is interested in how survival is affected by the disease, there is also the net survival rate, which filters out the effect of mortality from other causes than the disease. The two main ways to calculate net survival are relative survival and cause-specific survival or disease-specific survival.

Relative survival has the advantage that it does not depend on accuracy of the reported cause of death; cause specific survival has the advantage that it does not depend on the ability to find a similar population of people without the disease.

=== Relative survival ===
Relative survival is calculated by dividing the overall survival after diagnosis of a disease by the survival as observed in a similar population that was not diagnosed with that disease. A similar population is composed of individuals with at least age and gender similar to those diagnosed with the disease.

=== Cause-specific survival and disease-specific survival ===
Disease-specific survival rate refers to "the percentage of people in a study or treatment group who have not died from a specific disease in a defined period of time. The time period usually begins at the time of diagnosis or at the start of treatment and ends at the time of death. Patients who died from causes other than the disease being studied are not counted in this measurement."

== Median survival ==
Median survival, or "median overall survival" is also commonly used to express survival rates. This is the amount of time after which 50% of the patients have died and 50% have survived. In ongoing settings such as clinical trials, the median has the advantage that it can be calculated once 50% of subjects have reached the clinical endpoint of the trial, whereas calculation of an arithmetical mean can only be done after all subjects have reached the endpoint.

The median overall survival is frequently used by the U.S. Food and Drug Administration to evaluate the effectiveness of a novel cancer treatment. Studies find that new cancer drugs approved by the U.S. Food and Drug Administration improve overall survival by a median of 2 to 3 months depending on the sample and analyzed time period: 2.1 months, 2.4 months, 2.8 months.

== Five-year survival ==
Five-year survival rate measures survival at five years after diagnosis.

== Disease-free survival, progression-free survival, and metastasis-free survival ==
In cancer research, various types of survival rate can be relevant, depending on the cancer type and stage. These include the disease-free survival (DFS) (the period after curative treatment [disease eliminated] when no disease can be detected), the progression-free survival (PFS) (the period after treatment when disease [which could not be eliminated] remains stable, that is, does not progress), and the metastasis-free survival (MFS) or distant metastasis–free survival (DMFS) (the period until metastasis is detected). Progression can be categorized as local progression, regional progression, locoregional progression, and metastatic progression.

== See also ==
- Progression-free survival
- Response Evaluation Criteria in Solid Tumors (RECIST)
- Surveillance, Epidemiology, and End Results database (SEER)
