= Relative survival =

Calculation in epidemiology

Relative survival of a disease, in survival analysis, is calculated by dividing the overall survival after diagnosis by the survival as observed in a similar population not diagnosed with that disease. A similar population is composed of individuals with at least age and gender similar to those diagnosed with the disease.

When describing the survival experience of a group of people or patients typically the method of overall survival is used, and it presents estimates of the proportion of people or patients alive at a certain point in time. The problem with measuring overall survival by using the Kaplan-Meier or actuarial survival methods is that the estimates include two causes of death: deaths from the disease of interest and deaths from all other causes, which includes old age, other cancers, trauma and any other possible cause of death. In general, survival analysis is interested in the deaths by a disease rather than all causes. Thus, a "cause-specific survival analysis" is employed to measure disease-specific survival. Thus, there are two ways in performing a cause-specific survival analysis "competing risks survival analysis" and "relative survival."

== Competing risks survival analysis ==
This form of analysis is known by its use of death certificates. In traditional overall survival analysis, the cause of death is irrelevant to the analysis. In a competing risks survival analyses, each death certificate is reviewed. If the disease of interest is cancer, and the patient dies of a car accident, the patient is labelled as censored at death instead of being labelled as having died. Issues with this method arise, as each hospital and or registry may code for causes of death differently.

For example, there is variability in the way a patient who has cancer and commits suicide is coded/labelled. In addition, if a patient has an eye removed from an ocular cancer and dies getting hit while crossing the road because he did not see the car, he would often be considered to be censored rather than having died from the cancer or its subsequent effects.

== Hazard rate ==
The relative survival form of analysis is more complex than "competing risks" but is considered the gold-standard for performing a cause-specific survival analysis. It is based on two rates: the overall hazard rate observed in a diseased population and the background or expected hazard rate in the general or background population.

Deaths from the disease in a single time period are the total number of deaths (overall number of deaths) minus the expected number of deaths in the general population. If 10 deaths per hundred population occur in a population of cancer patients, but only 1 death occurs per hundred general population, the disease specific number of deaths (excess hazard rate) is 9 deaths per hundred population. The classic equation for the excess hazard rate is as follows:

$$\lambda = \lambda^*+\nu\,\!$$

$\lambda = \text{Overall Death Rate},~\lambda^*=\text{Expected death rate},~\nu=\text{Disease-specific death rate}$

The equation does not define a survival proportion but simply describes the relationships between disease-specific death (excess hazard) rates, background mortality rates (expected death rate) and the overall observed mortality rates. The excess hazard rate is related to relative survival, just as hazard rates are related to overall survival.

== Cancer survival ==
Relative survival is typically used in the analysis of cancer registry data. Cause-specific survival estimation using the coding of death certificates has considerable inaccuracy and inconsistency and does not permit the comparison of rates across registries.

The diagnosis of cause-of-death is varied between practitioners. How does one code for a patient who dies of heart failure after receiving a chemotherapeutic agent with known deleterious cardiac side-effects? In essence, what really matters is not why the population dies but if the rate of death is higher than that of the general population.

If all patients are dying of car crashes, perhaps the tumour or treatment predisposes them to have visual or perceptual disturbances, which lead them to be more likely to die in a car crash. In addition, it has been shown that patients coded in a large US cancer registry as suffering from a non-cancer death are 1.37 times as likely to die than does a member of the general population.

If the coding was accurate, this figure should approximate 1.0 as the rate of those dying of non-cancer deaths (in a population of cancer sufferers) should approximate that of the general population. Thus, the use of relative survival provides an accurate way to measure survival rates that are associated with the cancer in question.

== Epidemiology ==
In epidemiology, relative survival (as opposed to overall survival and associated with excess hazard rates) is defined as the ratio of observed survival in a population to the expected or background survival rate. It can be thought of as the kaplan-meier survivor function for a particular year, divided by the expected survival rate in that particular year. That is typically known as the relative survival (RS).

If five consecutive years are multiplied, the resulting figure would be known as cumulative relative survival (CRS). It is analogous to the five-year overall survival rate, but it is a way of describing cancer-specific risk of death over five years after diagnosis.

== Software ==
There are several software suites available to estimate relative survival rates. Regression modelling can be performed using maximum likelihood estimation methods by using Stata or R. For example, the R package cmprsk may be used for competing risk analyses which utilize sub-distribution or 'Fine and Gray' regression methods.

== See also ==
- Five-year survival rate – Type of survival rate
- Prognosis – Medical term for the likely development of a disease
- Survival rate – Medical analysis of disease
