= Cancer immunotherapy =

Artificial stimulation of the immune system to treat cancer

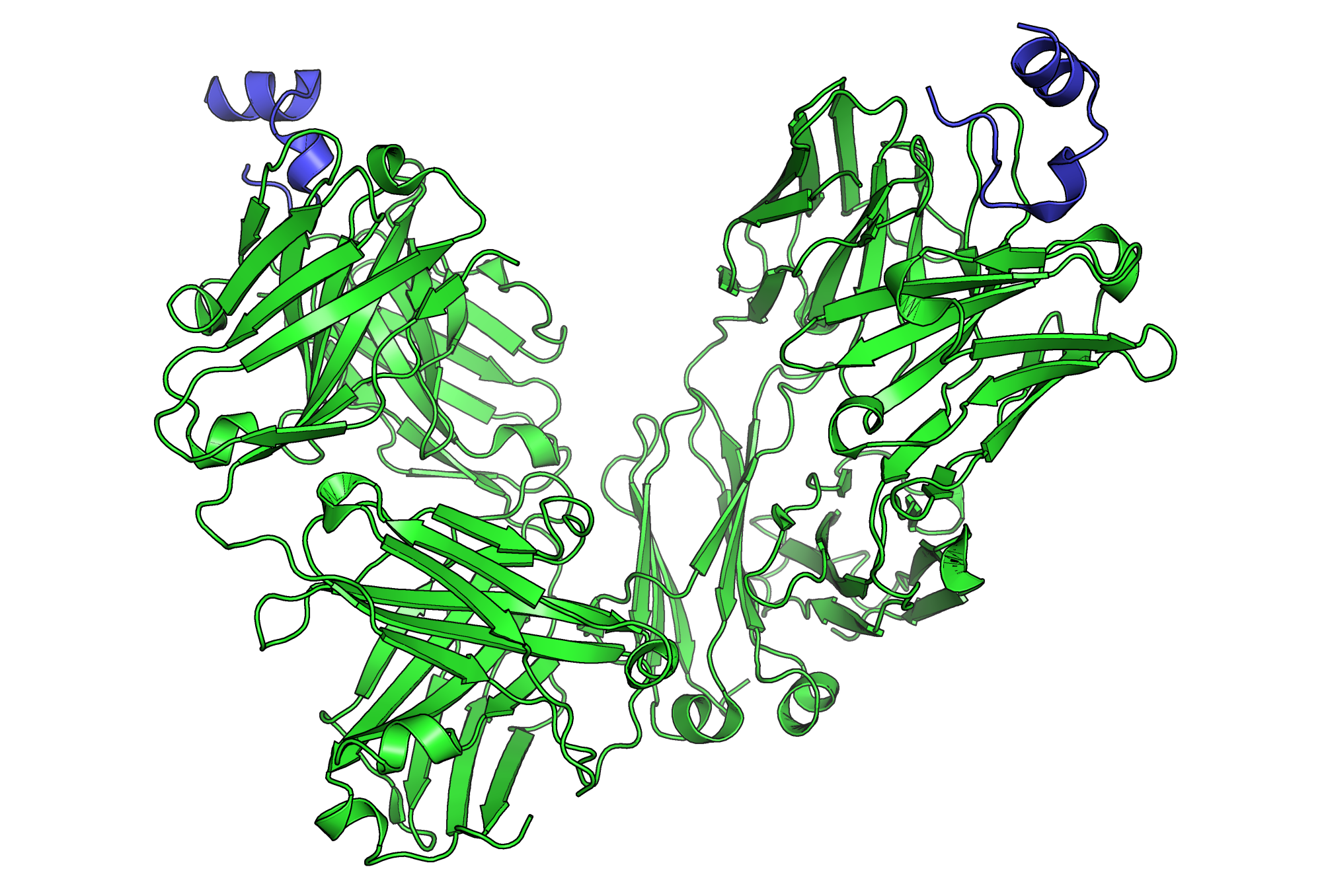
- Peptide epitope of CD20 bound to rituximab's FAB
- Specialty: Tumor immunology

Cancer immunotherapy (immuno-oncotherapy) is the stimulation of the immune system to treat cancer, improving the immune system's natural ability to fight the disease. It is an application of the basic science of cancer immunology (immuno-oncology) and a growing subspecialty of oncology.

Cancer immunotherapy exploits the fact that cancer cells often have tumor antigens, molecules on their surface that can bind to antibody proteins or T-cell receptors, triggering an immune system response. The tumor antigens are often proteins or other macromolecules (e.g., carbohydrates). Normal antibodies bind to external pathogens, but the modified immunotherapy antibodies bind to the tumor antigens marking and identifying the cancer cells for the immune system to inhibit or kill. The clinical success of cancer immunotherapy is highly variable between different forms of cancer; for instance, certain subtypes of gastric cancer react well to the approach whereas immunotherapy is not effective for other subtypes.

Major types of cancer immunotherapy include immune checkpoint inhibitors, which block inhibitory pathways such as PD-1/PD-L1 and CTLA-4 to enhance T cell activity against tumors. These therapies have shown effectiveness in treating cancers such as melanoma and lung cancer.

Adoptive cell therapies, including chimeric antigen receptor (CAR) T cell therapy, involve modifying a patient's immune cells to recognize cancer-specific antigens. These therapies have been particularly effective in certain blood cancers. Natural killer cell (NK) therapies and CAR-NK cell approaches are also being explored, leveraging NK cells' innate ability to target tumor cells. Other strategies include cancer vaccines, which aim to provoke an immune response against tumor-associated antigens, and may be either preventive or therapeutic. Immunomodulatory agents such as cytokines (e.g., interleukin-2, interferon-alpha) and Bacillus Calmette-Guerin (BCG) are used to enhance immune activity or alter the tumor microenvironment. Oncolytic virus therapies, which employ engineered viruses to selectively kill cancer cells while promoting systemic immunity, are also under investigation.

In 2018, American immunologist James P. Allison and Japanese immunologist Tasuku Honjo received the Nobel Prize in Physiology or Medicine for their discovery of cancer therapy by inhibition of negative immune regulation.

== History ==
"During the 17th and 18th centuries, various forms of immunotherapy in cancer became widespread... In the 18th and 19th centuries, septic dressings enclosing ulcerative tumours were used for the treatment of cancer. Surgical wounds were left open to facilitate the development of infection, and purulent sores were created deliberately... One of the most well-known effects of microorganisms on ... cancer was reported in 1891, when an American surgeon, William Coley, inoculated patients having inoperable tumours with [ Streptococcus pyogenes ]." "Coley thoroughly reviewed the literature available at that time and found 38 reports of cancer patients with accidental or iatrogenic feverish erysipelas. In 12 patients, the sarcoma or carcinoma had completely disappeared; the others had substantially improved. Coley decided to attempt the therapeutic use of iatrogenic erysipelas..." "Coley developed a toxin that contained heat-killed bacteria [ Streptococcus pyogenes and Serratia marcescens ]. Until 1963, this treatment was used for the treatment of sarcomas." "Coley injected more than 1000 cancer patients with bacteria or bacterial products." "51.9% of [Coley's] patients with inoperable soft-tissue sarcomas showed complete tumour regression and survived for more than 5 years, and 21.2% of the patients had no clinical evidence of tumour at least 20 years after this treatment..." Research continued in the 20th century under Maria O'Connor Hornung at Tulane Medical School.

In the 1980s, researchers at the National Cancer Institute's Center for Cancer Research (CCR) began exploring the then-heretical idea that a patient's immune system could be harnessed to fight cancer. These researchers included Michael Potter, Ira Pastan, and Steven Rosenberg who developed approaches including monoclonal antibody-based immunotoxins, checkpoint inhibitors, cytokine-based therapies, and adoptive cell therapy studies.

== Types and categories ==
There are several types of immunotherapy used to treat cancer:

- Immune checkpoint inhibitors: drugs that block immune system checkpoints to allow immune cells to respond more strongly to the cancer.
- T-cell transfer therapy: a treatment that takes T-cells from the tumor and selects or changes them in the lab to better attack cancer cells, then reintroduces them into the patient.
- Monoclonal antibodies: designed to bind to specific targets on cancer cells, marking cancer cells so that they will be better seen and destroyed by the immune system.
- Treatment vaccines: also known as therapeutic cancer vaccines, help the immune system learn to recognize and react to mutant proteins specific to the tumor and destroy cancer cells containing them.
- Immune system modulators: agents that enhance the body's immune response against cancer.

Immunotherapies can be categorized as active or passive based on their ability to engage the host immune system against cancer. Active immunotherapy specifically targets tumor cells via the immune system. Examples include therapeutic cancer vaccines (also known as treatment vaccines, which are designed to boost the body's immune system to fight cancer), CAR-T cells, and targeted antibody therapies. In contrast, passive immunotherapy does not directly target tumor cells, but enhances the ability of the immune system to attack cancer cells. Examples include checkpoint inhibitors and cytokines.

Active cellular therapies aim to destroy cancer cells by recognition of distinct markers known as antigens. In cancer vaccines, the goal is to generate an immune response to these antigens through a vaccine. Currently, only one vaccine (sipuleucel-T for prostate cancer) has been approved. In cell-mediated therapies like CAR-T cell therapy, immune cells are extracted from the patient, genetically engineered to recognize tumor-specific antigens, and returned to the patient. Cell types that can be used in this way are natural killer (NK) cells, lymphokine-activated killer cells, cytotoxic T cells, and dendritic cells. Finally, specific antibodies can be developed that recognize cancer cells and target them for destruction by the immune system. Examples of such antibodies include rituximab (targeting CD-20), trastuzumab (targeting HER-2), and cetuximab (targeting EGFR).

Passive antibody therapies aim to increase the activity of the immune system without specifically targeting cancer cells. For example, cytokines directly stimulate the immune system and increase immune activity. Checkpoint inhibitors target proteins (immune checkpoints) that normally dampen the immune response. This enhances the ability of the immune system to attack cancer cells. Current research is identifying new potential targets to enhance immune function. Approved checkpoint inhibitors include antibodies such as ipilimumab, nivolumab, and pembrolizumab.

== Cellular immunotherapy ==
Immune cell-based therapies for solid tumors may be limited by tumor-antigen heterogeneity, restricted immune-cell trafficking, an immunosuppressive tumor microenvironment, limited cell persistence, treatment-related toxicities, and complex manufacturing requirements.

=== Dendritic cell therapy ===
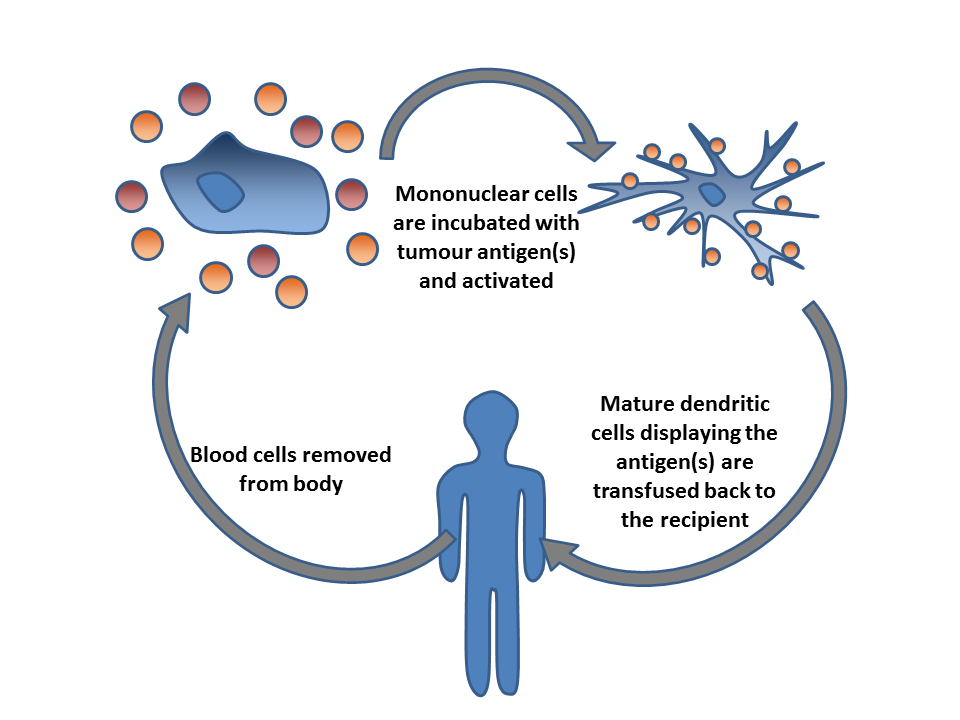
Blood cells are removed from the body, incubated with tumour antigen(s), and activated. Mature dendritic cells are returned to the original cancer-bearing donor to induce an immune response.

Dendritic cell therapy provokes anti-tumor responses by causing dendritic cells to present tumor antigens to lymphocytes, which activates them, priming them to kill other cells that present the antigen. Dendritic cells are antigen-presenting cells (APCs) in the mammalian immune system. In cancer treatment, they aid cancer antigen targeting. The only approved cellular cancer therapy based on dendritic cells is sipuleucel-T.

One method of inducing dendritic cells to present tumor antigens is by vaccination with autologous tumor lysates or short peptides (small parts of the protein that correspond to the protein antigens on cancer cells). These peptides are often given in combination with adjuvants (highly immunogenic substances) to increase the immune and anti-tumor responses. Other adjuvants include proteins or other chemicals that attract and/or activate dendritic cells, such as granulocyte-macrophage colony-stimulating factor (GM-CSF). The most common sources of antigens used for dendritic cell vaccine in glioblastoma (GBM) as an aggressive brain tumor were whole tumor lysate, CMV antigen RNA and tumor-associated peptides like EGFRvIII.

Dendritic cells can also be activated in vivo by making tumor cells express GM-CSF. This can be achieved by either genetically engineering tumor cells to produce GM-CSF or by infecting tumor cells with an oncolytic virus that expresses GM-CSF.

Another strategy is to remove dendritic cells from the blood of a patient and activate them outside the body. The dendritic cells are activated in the presence of tumor antigens, which may be a single tumor-specific peptide/protein or a tumor cell lysate (a solution of broken-down tumor cells). These cells (with optional adjuvants) are infused and provoke an immune response.

Dendritic cell therapies include the use of antibodies that bind to receptors on the surface of dendritic cells. Antigens can be added to the antibody and can induce the dendritic cells to mature and provide immunity to the tumor. Dendritic cell receptors such as TLR3, TLR7, TLR8 or CD40 have been used as antibody targets. Dendritic cell-NK cell interface also has an important role in immunotherapy. The design of new dendritic cell-based vaccination strategies should also encompass NK cell-stimulating potency. It is critical to systematically incorporate NK cells monitoring as an outcome in antitumor DC-based clinical trials.

==== Drugs ====
Sipuleucel-T (Provenge) was approved for treatment of asymptomatic or minimally symptomatic metastatic castration-resistant prostate cancer in 2010. The treatment consists of removal of antigen-presenting cells from blood by leukapheresis and growing them with the fusion protein PA2024 made from GM-CSF and prostate-specific prostatic acid phosphatase (PAP) and reinfused. This process is repeated three times.

=== Adoptive T-cell therapy ===
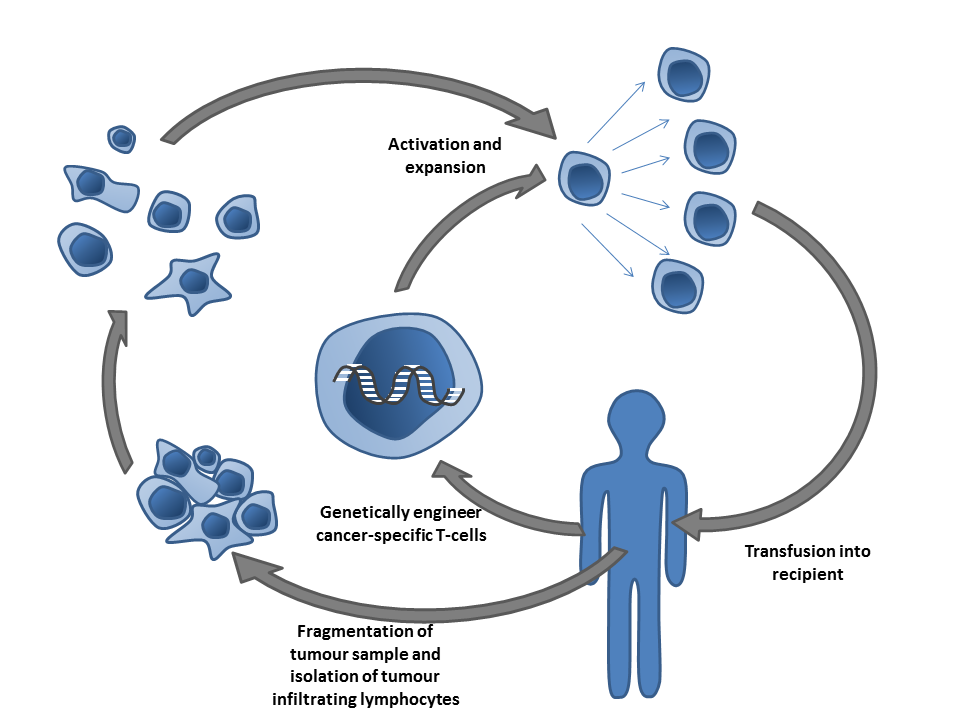
Cancer specific T-cells can be obtained by fragmentation and isolation of tumour infiltrating lymphocytes, or by genetically engineering cells from peripheral blood. The cells are activated and grown prior to transfusion into the recipient (tumor bearer).

Adoptive T cell therapy is a form of passive immunization by the transfusion of T-cells. They are found in blood and tissue and typically activate when they find foreign pathogens. Activation occurs when the T-cell's surface receptors encounter cells that display parts of foreign proteins (either on their surface or intracellularly). These can be either infected cells or other antigen-presenting cells (APCs). The latter are found in normal tissue and in tumor tissue, where they are known as tumor-infiltrating lymphocytes (TILs). They are activated by the presence of APCs such as dendritic cells that present tumor antigens. Although these cells can attack tumors, the tumor microenvironment is highly immunosuppressive, interfering with immune-mediated tumour death.

Multiple ways of producing tumour-destroying T-cells have been developed. Most commonly, T-cells specific to a tumor antigen can be removed from a tumor sample (TILs) or filtered from blood. The T-cells can optionally be modified in various ways, cultured and infused into patients. T cells can be modified via genetic engineering, producing CAR-T cell or TCR T cells or by exposing the T cells to tumor antigens in a non-immunosuppressive environment, that they recognize as foreign and learn to attack.

Another approach is transfer of haploidentical γδ T cells or natural killer cells from a healthy donor. The major advantage of this approach is that these cells do not cause graft-versus-host disease. The disadvantage is that transferred cells frequently have impaired function.

==== Tumor-derived T cell therapy ====
The simplest example involves removing TILs from a tumor, culturing but not modifying them, and infusing the result back into the tumour. The first therapy of this type, Lifileucel, achieved US Food and Drug Administration (FDA) approval in February 2024.

==== CAR-T cell therapy ====
The premise of CAR-T immunotherapy is to modify T cells to recognize cancer cells in order to target and destroy them. Scientists harvest T cells from people, genetically alter them to add a chimeric antigen receptor (CAR) that specifically recognizes cancer cells, then infuse the resulting CAR-T cells into patients to attack their tumors.

Tisagenlecleucel (Kymriah), a chimeric antigen receptor (CAR-T) therapy, was approved by the FDA in 2017 to treat acute lymphoblastic leukemia (ALL). This treatment removes CD19 positive cells (B-cells) from the body (including the diseased cells, but also normal antibody-producing cells).

Axicabtagene ciloleucel (Yescarta) is another CAR-T therapeutic, approved in 2017 for treatment of diffuse large B-cell lymphoma (DLBCL).

==== Multifunctional alginate scaffolds ====
Multifunctional alginate scaffolds for T cell engineering and release (MASTER) is a technique for in situ engineering, replication and release of genetically engineered T cells. It is an evolution of CAR T cell therapy. T cells are extracted from the patient and mixed with a genetically engineered virus that contains a cancer-targeting gene (as with CAR T). The mixture is then added to a MASTER (scaffold), which absorbs them. The MASTER contains antibodies that activate the T cells and interleukins that trigger cell proliferation. The MASTER is then implanted into the patient. The activated T cells interact with the viruses to become CAR T cells. The interleukins stimulate these CAR T cells to proliferate, and the CAR T cells exit the MASTER to attack the cancer. The technique takes hours instead of weeks. And because the cells are younger, they last longer in the body, show stronger potency against cancer, and display fewer markers of exhaustion. These features were demonstrated in mouse models. The treatment was more effective and longer-lasting against lymphoma.

==== T cell receptor T cell therapy ====
T cell receptor T cell therapy (TCR-T) is a type of adoptive T-cell therapy that targets some cancers. TCR-T therapies are based on the use and redirection of the T cell receptor (TCR) against specific antigen of interest such as a tumor antigens. TCRs are heterodimers made of alpha and beta peptide chains to recognize MHC-presented polypeptide fragment molecules. Unlike CAR-T, which uses cell surface antigens, TCR-T can recognize MHC's larger set of intracellular antigen fragments. However, TCR-T cell therapy depends on MHC molecules, limiting its usefulness.

Each T cell's TCR is specific to one antigen and sits on the T cell's surface. The affinity of human TCRs to tumor antigens is relatively low, rendering them unable to recognize and kill tumor cells effectively. The modified T cell has much higher affinity, which enhances both recognition and affinity supporting the recognition of tumor cells.

== Antibody therapy ==
Many forms of antibodies can be engineered.

Each antibody binds only one specific antigen.

Monoclonal antibodies (mAbs) have varied therapeutic uses. It is possible to create a mAb that binds specifically to almost any extracellular target, such as cell surface proteins and cytokines. They can be used to render their target ineffective (e.g. by preventing receptor binding), to induce a specific cell signal (by activating receptors), to cause the immune system to attack specific cells, or to bring a drug to a specific cell type (such as with radioimmunotherapy which delivers cytotoxic radiation).

=== Antibody types ===
==== Conjugation ====
Two types are used in cancer treatments:

- Naked monoclonal antibodies are antibodies without added elements. Most antibody therapies use this antibody type.
- Conjugated monoclonal antibodies are joined to another molecule, which is either cytotoxic or radioactive. The toxic chemicals are those typically used as chemotherapy drugs, but other toxins can be used. The antibody binds to specific antigens on cancer cell surfaces, directing the therapy to the tumor. Radioactive compound-linked antibodies are referred to as radiolabelled. Chemolabelled or immunotoxins antibodies are tagged with chemotherapeutic molecules or toxins, respectively. Research has also demonstrated conjugation of a TLR agonist to an anti-tumor monoclonal antibody.

==== Fc regions ====
Fc's ability to bind Fc receptors is important because it allows antibodies to activate the immune system. Fc regions are varied: they exist in numerous subtypes and can be further modified, for example with the addition of sugars in a process called glycosylation. Changes in the Fc region can alter an antibody's ability to engage Fc receptors and, by extension, will determine the type of immune response that the antibody triggers. For example, immune checkpoint blockers targeting PD-1 are antibodies designed to bind PD-1 expressed by T cells and reactivate these cells to eliminate tumors. Anti-PD-1 drugs contain not only a Fab region that binds PD-1 but also an Fc region. Experimental work indicates that the Fc portion of cancer immunotherapy drugs can affect the outcome of treatment. For example, anti-PD-1 drugs with Fc regions that bind inhibitory Fc receptors can have decreased therapeutic efficacy. Imaging studies have further shown that the Fc region of anti-PD-1 drugs can bind Fc receptors expressed by tumor-associated macrophages. This process removes the drugs from their intended targets (i.e. PD-1 molecules expressed on the surface of T cells) and limits therapeutic efficacy. Furthermore, antibodies targeting the co-stimulatory protein CD40 require engagement with selective Fc receptors for optimal therapeutic efficacy. Together, these studies underscore the importance of Fc status in antibody-based immune checkpoint targeting strategies.

==== Human/non-human antibodies ====
Antibodies can come from a variety of sources, including human cells, mice, and a combination of the two (chimeric antibodies). Different sources of antibodies can provoke different kinds of immune responses. For example, the human immune system can recognize mouse antibodies (also known as murine antibodies) and trigger an immune response against them. This could reduce the effectiveness of the antibodies as a treatment and cause an immune reaction. Chimeric antibodies attempt to reduce murine antibodies' immunogenicity by replacing part of the antibody with the corresponding human counterpart. Humanized antibodies are almost completely human; only the complementarity determining regions of the variable regions are derived from murine sources. Human antibodies have been produced using unmodified human DNA.

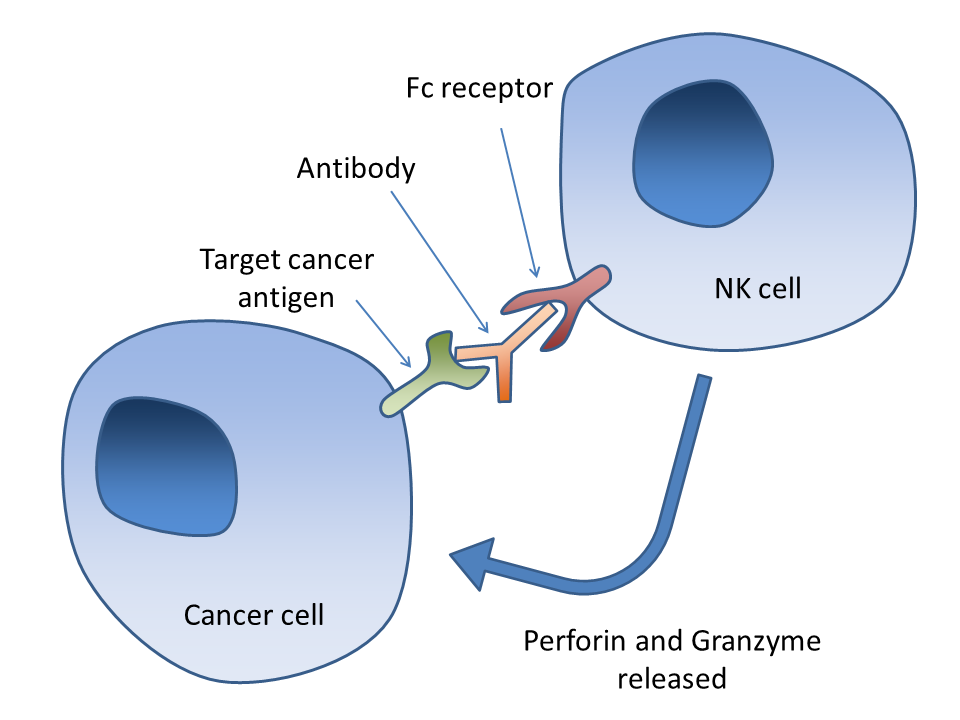
Antibody-dependent cell-mediated cytotoxicity. When the Fc receptors on natural killer (NK) cells interact with Fc regions of antibodies bound to cancer cells, the NK cell releases perforin and granzyme, leading to cancer cell apoptosis.

=== Mechanism of action ===
==== Antibody-dependent cell-mediated cytotoxicity (ADCC) ====
Antibody-dependent cell-mediated cytotoxicity (ADCC) requires antibodies to bind to target cell surfaces. Antibodies are formed of a binding region (Fab) and the Fc region that can be detected by immune system cells via their Fc surface receptors. Fc receptors are found on many immune system cells, including NK cells. When NK cells encounter antibody-coated cells, the latter's Fc regions interact with their Fc receptors, releasing perforin and granzyme B to kill the tumor cell. Examples include rituximab, ofatumumab, elotuzumab, and alemtuzumab. Antibodies under development have altered Fc regions that have higher affinity for a specific type of Fc receptor, FcγRIIIA, which can dramatically increase effectiveness.

=== Anti-CD47 therapy ===
Many tumor cells overexpress CD47 to escape immunosurveilance of host immune system. CD47 binds to its receptor signal-regulatory protein alpha (SIRPα) and downregulate phagocytosis of tumor cell. Therefore, anti-CD47 therapy aims to restore clearance of tumor cells. Additionally, growing evidence supports the employment of tumor antigen-specific T cell response in response to anti-CD47 therapy. A number of therapeutics are being developed, including anti-CD47 antibodies, engineered decoy receptors, anti-SIRPα antibodies and bispecific agents. As of 2017, wide range of solid and hematologic malignancies were being clinically tested.

=== Anti-GD2 antibodies ===
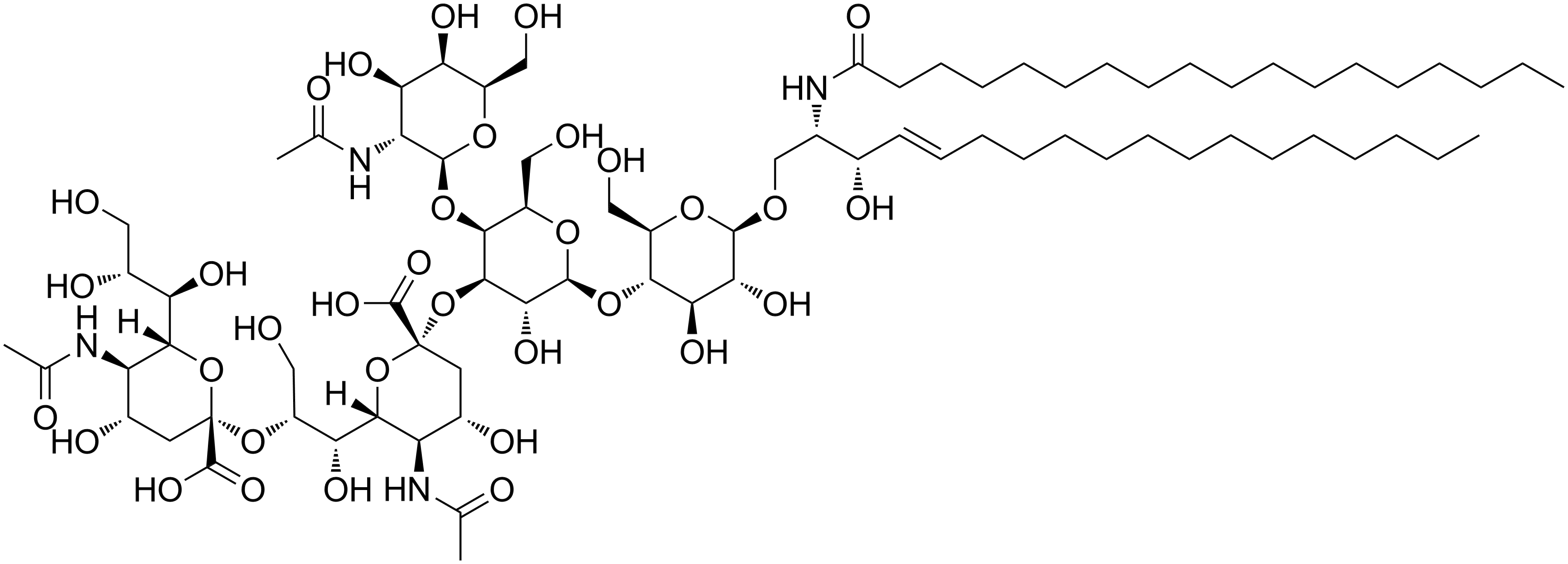
The GD2 ganglioside

Carbohydrate antigens on the surface of cells can be used as targets for immunotherapy. GD2 is a ganglioside found on the surface of many types of cancer cell including neuroblastoma, retinoblastoma, melanoma, small cell lung cancer, brain tumors, osteosarcoma, rhabdomyosarcoma, Ewing's sarcoma, liposarcoma, fibrosarcoma, leiomyosarcoma and other soft tissue sarcomas. It is not usually expressed on the surface of normal tissues, making it a good target for immunotherapy. As of 2014, clinical trials were underway.

==== Complement Activation ====
The complement system includes blood proteins that can cause cell death after an antibody binds to the cell surface (the classical complement pathway, among the ways of complement activation). Generally, the system deals with foreign pathogens but can be activated with therapeutic antibodies in cancer. The system can be triggered if the antibody is chimeric, humanized, or human; as long as it contains the IgG1 Fc region. Complement can lead to cell death by activation of the membrane attack complex, known as complement-dependent cytotoxicity; enhancement of antibody-dependent cell-mediated cytotoxicity; and CR3-dependent cellular cytotoxicity. Complement-dependent cytotoxicity occurs when antibodies bind to the cancer cell surface, the C1 complex binds to these antibodies and subsequently, protein pores are formed in cancer cell membrane.

Blocking

Antibody therapies can also function by binding to proteins and physically blocking them from interacting with other proteins. Checkpoint inhibitors (CTLA-4, PD-1, and PD-L1) operate by this mechanism. Briefly, checkpoint inhibitors are proteins that normally help to slow immune responses and prevent the immune system from attacking normal cells. Checkpoint inhibitors bind these proteins and prevent them from functioning normally, which increases the activity of the immune system. Examples include durvalumab, ipilimumab, nivolumab, and pembrolizumab.

=== FDA-approved antibodies ===
Cancer immunotherapy:Monoclonal antibodies
Antibody	Brand name	Type	Target	Approval date	Approved treatment(s)
Alemtuzumab	Campath	humanized	CD52	2001	B-cell chronic lymphocytic leukemia (CLL)
Atezolizumab	Tecentriq	humanized	PD-L1	2016	bladder cancer
Atezolizumab/hyaluronidase	Tecentriq Hybreza	humanized	PD-L1	2024	non-small cell lung cancer, small cell lung cancer, hepatocellular carcinoma, melanoma, and alveolar soft part sarcoma
Avelumab	Bavencio	human	PD-L1	2017	metastatic Merkel cell carcinoma
Durvalumab	Imfinzi	human	PD-L1	2017	bladder cancer non-small cell lung cancer
Elotuzumab	Empliciti	humanized	SLAMF7	2015	multiple myeloma
Ipilimumab	Yervoy	human	CTLA4	2011	metastatic melanoma
Nivolumab	Opdivo	human	PD-1	2014	unresectable or metastatic melanoma, squamous non-small cell lung cancer, Renal cell carcinoma, colorectal cancer, hepatocellular carcinoma, classical hodgkin lymphoma
Ofatumumab	Arzerra	human	CD20	2009	refractory CLL
Pembrolizumab	Keytruda	humanized	PD-1	2014	unresectable or metastatic melanoma, squamous non-small cell lung cancer (NSCLC), Hodgkin's lymphoma, Merkel-cell carcinoma (MCC), primary mediastinal B-cell lymphoma (PMBCL), stomach cancer, cervical cancer
Rituximab	Rituxan, Mabthera	chimeric	CD20	1997	non-Hodgkin lymphoma
Rituximab/hyaluronidase	Rituxan Hycela	chimeric	CD20	2017	follicular lymphoma, diffuse large B-cell lymphoma, chronic lymphocytic leukemia
Trastuzumab	Rituxan Hycela	humanized	HER2/neu	1998	breast cancer, gastric or gastroesophageal junction adenocarcinoma

==== Alemtuzumab ====
Alemtuzumab (Campath-1H) is an anti-CD52 humanized IgG1 monoclonal antibody indicated for the treatment of fludarabine-refractory chronic lymphocytic leukemia (CLL), cutaneous T-cell lymphoma, peripheral T-cell lymphoma and T-cell prolymphocytic leukemia. CD52 is found on >95% of peripheral blood lymphocytes (both T-cells and B-cells) and monocytes, but its function in lymphocytes is unknown. It binds to CD52 and initiates its cytotoxic effect by complement fixation and ADCC mechanisms. Due to the antibody target (cells of the immune system), common complications of alemtuzumab therapy are infection, toxicity and myelosuppression.

==== Atezolizumab ====
Atezolizumab, sold under the brand name Tecentriq among others, is a monoclonal antibody medication used to treat urothelial carcinoma, non-small cell lung cancer (NSCLC), small cell lung cancer (SCLC), hepatocellular carcinoma and alveolar soft part sarcoma, but discontinued for use in triple-negative breast cancer (TNBC). It is a fully humanized, engineered monoclonal antibody of IgG1 isotype against the protein programmed cell death-ligand 1 (PD-L1).

The most common side effects when used on its own include tiredness, reduced appetite, nausea, vomiting, cough, difficulty breathing, diarrhea, rash, fever, pain in the back, joints, muscles and bones, weakness, itching and urinary tract infection. The most common side effects when used with other cancer medicines include peripheral neuropathy (nerve damage in the hands and feet), nausea, anemia (low red blood cell counts), neutropenia (low white blood cell counts), thrombocytopenia (low platelet counts), rash, tiredness, constipation, reduced appetite, diarrhea, and cough.

Atezolizumab was the first PD-L1 inhibitor approved by the US Food and Drug Administration (FDA) for bladder cancer. In the European Union, atezolizumab is the first PD-(L)1 cancer immunotherapy for subcutaneous injection. Atezolizumab is a therapeutic alternative on the World Health Organization's List of Essential Medicines.

==== Atezolizumab/hyaluronidase ====
Atezolizumab/hyaluronidase, sold under the brand name Tecentriq Hybreza, is a fixed-dose combination medication used for the treatment of non-small cell lung cancer, small cell lung cancer, hepatocellular carcinoma, melanoma, and alveolar soft part sarcoma. It contains atezolizumab, a programmed death-ligand 1 (PD-L1) blocking monoclonal antibody; and hyaluronidase (human recombinant), an endoglycosidase. It is taken by subcutaneous injection.

The most common adverse reactions include fatigue, musculoskeletal pain, cough, dyspnea, and decreased appetite.

Atezolizumab/hyaluronidase was approved for medical use in the United States in September 2024.

==== Avelumab ====
Avelumab, sold under the brand name Bavencio, is a fully human monoclonal antibody medication for the treatment of Merkel cell carcinoma, urothelial carcinoma, and renal cell carcinoma.

Common side effects include fatigue, musculoskeletal pain, diarrhea, nausea, infusion-related reactions, rash, decreased appetite and swelling of the limbs (peripheral edema).

Avelumab targets the protein programmed death-ligand 1 (PD-L1). It has received orphan drug designation by the European Medicines Agency (EMA) for the treatment of gastric cancer in January 2017. The US Food and Drug Administration (FDA) approved it in March 2017, for the treatment of Merkel-cell carcinoma, an aggressive type of skin cancer. The EMA approved it in September 2017, for the same indication. This is the first FDA-approved treatment for metastatic Merkel-cell carcinoma, a rare, aggressive form of skin cancer. Avelumab was developed by Merck KGaA and Pfizer.

==== Durvalumab ====
Durvalumab (Imfinzi) is a human immunoglobulin G1 kappa (IgG1κ) monoclonal antibody that blocks the interaction of programmed cell death ligand 1 (PD-L1) with the PD-1 and CD80 (B7.1) molecules. Durvalumab is approved for the treatment of patients with locally advanced or metastatic urothelial carcinoma who:

- have disease progression during or following platinum-containing chemotherapy.
- have disease progression within 12 months of neoadjuvant or adjuvant treatment with platinum-containing chemotherapy.

On 16 February 2018, the Food and Drug Administration approved durvalumab for patients with unresectable stage III non-small cell lung cancer (NSCLC) whose disease has not progressed following concurrent platinum-based chemotherapy and radiation therapy.

==== Elotuzumab ====
Elotuzumab, sold under the brand name Empliciti, is a humanized IgG1 monoclonal antibody medication used in combination with lenalidomide and dexamethasone, for adults that have received 1 to 3 prior therapies for the treatment of multiple myeloma. It is also indicated for adult patients in combination with pomalidomide and dexamethasone, who have received 2 prior therapies including lenalidomide and a protease inhibitor. Administration of elotuzumab is done intravenously. Each intravenous injection of elotuzumab should be premedicated with dexamethasone, diphenhydramine, ranitidine and acetaminophen. It is being developed by Bristol Myers Squibb and AbbVie.

Common side effects of elotuzumab with lenalidomide and dexamethasone include fatigue, diarrhea, pyrexia, constipation, cough, peripheral neuropathy, nasopharyngitis, upper respiratory tract infection, decreased appetite, and pneumonia. The most common side effects of elotuzumab with pomalidomide and dexamethasone includeconstipation and hyperglycemia. There is no available information for the use of elotuzumab in pregnant women.

Elotuzumab is an immunostimulatory antibody that targets the Signaling Lymphocytic Activation Molecule Family member 7 (SLAMF7) through two mechanisms.

In May 2014, it was granted breakthrough therapy designation by the US Food and Drug Administration (FDA) (for multiple myeloma). The initial FDA approval of elotuzumab in 2015 in combination with lenalidomide and dexamethasone was carried out through the results illustrated in the ELOQUENT 2 study. In May 2016 the EC/EU gave a similar approval. Furthermore, the results of the ELOQUENT 3 study led to the FDA approval of elotuzumab in combination with pomalidomide and dexamethasone in 2018.

==== Ipilimumab ====
Ipilimumab (Yervoy) is a human IgG1 antibody that binds the surface protein CTLA4. In normal physiology T-cells are activated by two signals: the T-cell receptor binding to an antigen-MHC complex and T-cell surface receptor CD28 binding to CD80 or CD86 proteins. CTLA4 binds to CD80 or CD86, preventing the binding of CD28 to these surface proteins and therefore negatively regulates the activation of T-cells.

Active cytotoxic T-cells are required for the immune system to attack melanoma cells. Normally inhibited active melanoma-specific cytotoxic T-cells can produce an effective anti-tumor response. Ipilimumab can cause a shift in the ratio of regulatory T-cells to cytotoxic T-cells to increase the anti-tumor response. Regulatory T-cells inhibit other T-cells, which may benefit the tumor.

==== Nivolumab ====
Nivolumab is a human IgG4 antibody that prevents T-cell inactivation by blocking the binding of programmed cell death 1 ligand 1 or programmed cell death 1 ligand 2 (PD-L1 or PD-L2), a protein expressed by cancer cells, with PD-1, a protein found on the surface of activated T-cells. Nivolumab is used in advanced melanoma, metastatic renal cell carcinoma, advanced lung cancer, advanced head and neck cancer, and Hodgkin's lymphoma.

==== Ofatumumab ====
Ofatumumab is a second generation human IgG1 antibody that binds to CD20. It is used in the treatment of chronic lymphocytic leukemia (CLL) because the cancerous cells of CLL are usually CD20-expressing B-cells. Unlike rituximab, which binds to a large loop of the CD20 protein, ofatumumab binds to a separate, small loop. This may explain their different characteristics. Compared to rituximab, ofatumumab induces complement-dependent cytotoxicity at a lower dose with less immunogenicity.

==== Pembrolizumab ====
As of 2019, pembrolizumab, which blocks PD-1, programmed cell death protein 1, has been used via intravenous infusion to treat inoperable or metastatic melanoma, metastatic non-small cell lung cancer (NSCLC) in certain situations, as a second-line treatment for head and neck squamous cell carcinoma (HNSCC), after platinum-based chemotherapy, and for the treatment of adult and pediatric patients with refractory classic Hodgkin's lymphoma (cHL). It is also indicated for certain patients with urothelial carcinoma, stomach cancer and cervical cancer.

==== Rituximab ====
Rituximab is a chimeric monoclonal IgG1 antibody specific for CD20, developed from its parent antibody Ibritumomab. As with ibritumomab, rituximab targets CD20, making it effective in treating certain B-cell malignancies. These include aggressive and indolent lymphomas such as diffuse large B-cell lymphoma and follicular lymphoma and leukemias such as B-cell chronic lymphocytic leukemia. Although the function of CD20 is relatively unknown, CD20 may be a calcium channel involved in B-cell activation. The antibody's mode of action is primarily through the induction of ADCC and complement-mediated cytotoxicity. Other mechanisms include apoptosis and cellular growth arrest. Rituximab also increases the sensitivity of cancerous B-cells to chemotherapy.

==== Trastuzumab ====
Trastuzumab, sold under the brand name Herceptin among others, is a monoclonal antibody used to treat breast cancer and stomach cancer. It is specifically used for cancer that is HER2 receptor positive. It may be used by itself or together with other chemotherapy medication. Trastuzumab is given by slow injection into a vein and injection just under the skin.

Common side effects include fever, infection, cough, headache, trouble sleeping, and rash. Other severe side effects include heart failure, allergic reactions, and lung disease. Use during pregnancy may harm the baby. Trastuzumab works by binding to the HER2 receptor and slowing down cell replication.

Trastuzumab was approved for medical use in the United States in September 1998, and in the European Union in August 2000. It is on the World Health Organization's List of Essential Medicines.

== Immune checkpoint blockade ==
Immune checkpoints in the tumour microenvironment

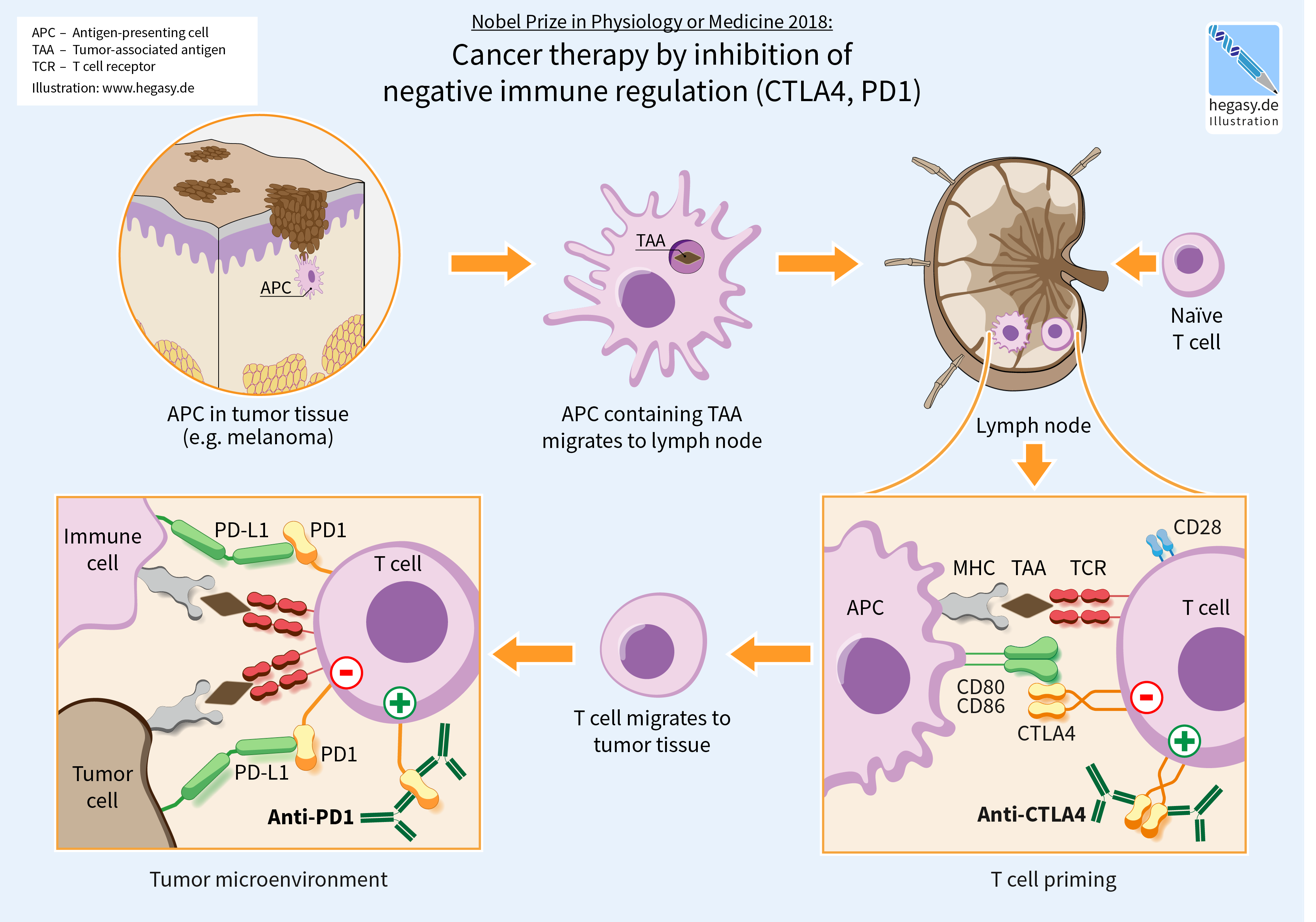
Cancer therapy by inhibition of negative immune regulation (CTLA4, PD1)

Immune checkpoints affect the immune system function. Immune checkpoints can be stimulatory or inhibitory. Tumors can use these checkpoints to protect themselves from immune system attacks. Checkpoint therapies approved as of 2012 block inhibitory checkpoint receptors. Blockade of negative feedback signaling to immune cells thus results in an enhanced immune response against tumors. As of 2020, immune checkpoint blockade therapies have varied effectiveness. In Hodgkin lymphoma and natural killer T-cell lymphoma, response rates are high, at 50–60%. Response rates are quite low for breast and prostate cancers, however. A major challenge are the large variations in responses to immunocheckpoint inhibitors, some patients showing spectacular clinical responses while no positive effects are seen in others. A plethora of possible reasons for the absence of efficacy in many patients have been proposed, but the biomedical community has still to begin to find consensus in this respect. For instance, a recent paper documented that infection with Helicobacter pylori would negatively influence the effects of immunocheckpoint inhibitors in gastric cancer., but this notion was quickly challenged by others.

One ligand-receptor interaction under investigation is the interaction between the transmembrane programmed cell death 1 protein (PDCD1, PD-1; also known as CD279) and its ligand, PD-1 ligand 1 (PD-L1, CD274). PD-L1 on the cell surface binds to PD1 on an immune cell surface, which inhibits immune cell activity. Among PD-L1 functions is a key regulatory role on T cell activities. It appears that (cancer-mediated) upregulation of PD-L1 on the cell surface may inhibit T cells that might otherwise attack. PD-L1 on cancer cells also inhibits FAS- and interferon-dependent apoptosis, protecting cells from cytotoxic molecules produced by T cells. Antibodies that bind to either PD-1 or PD-L1 and therefore block the interaction may allow the T-cells to attack the tumor.

=== CTLA-4 blockade ===
The first checkpoint antibody approved by the FDA was ipilimumab, approved in 2011 to treat melanoma. It blocks the immune checkpoint molecule CTLA-4. As of 2012, clinical trials have also shown some benefits of anti-CTLA-4 therapy on lung cancer or pancreatic cancer, specifically in combination with other drugs. In on-going trials the combination of CTLA-4 blockade with PD-1 or PD-L1 inhibitors is tested on different types of cancer.

However, as of 2015 it is known that patients treated with checkpoint blockade (specifically CTLA-4 blocking antibodies), or a combination of check-point blocking antibodies, are at high risk of having immune-related adverse events such as dermatologic, gastrointestinal, endocrine, or hepatic autoimmune reactions. These are most likely due to the breadth of the induced T-cell activation when anti-CTLA-4 antibodies are administered by injection in the bloodstream.

A 2024 cohort study of ICI use during pregnancy showed no overreporting of specific adverse effects on pregnancy, fetal, and/or newborn outcomes, interestingly.

Using a mouse model of bladder cancer, researchers have found that a local injection of a low dose anti-CTLA-4 in the tumour area had the same tumour inhibiting capacity as when the antibody was delivered in the blood. At the same time the levels of circulating antibodies were lower, suggesting that local administration of the anti-CTLA-4 therapy might result in fewer adverse events.

=== PD-1 inhibitors ===
Initial clinical trial results with IgG4 PD1 antibody nivolumab were published in 2010. It was approved in 2014. Nivolumab is approved to treat melanoma, lung cancer, kidney cancer, bladder cancer, head and neck cancer, and Hodgkin's lymphoma. A 2016 clinical trial for non-small cell lung cancer failed to meet its primary endpoint for treatment in the first-line setting, but is FDA-approved in subsequent lines of therapy.

Pembrolizumab (Keytruda) is another PD1 inhibitor that was approved by the FDA in 2014. Pembrolizumab is approved to treat melanoma and lung cancer.

Antibody BGB-A317 is a PD-1 inhibitor (designed to not bind Fc gamma receptor I) in early clinical trials.

=== PD-L1 inhibitors ===
In May 2016, PD-L1 inhibitor atezolizumab was approved for treating bladder cancer.

Anti-PD-L1 antibodies currently in development include avelumab and durvalumab, in addition to an inhibitory affimer.

=== CISH ===
Other modes of enhancing immuno-therapy include targeting so-called intrinsic immune checkpoint blockades. Many of these intrinsic regulators include molecules with ubiquitin ligase activity, including CBLB. More recently, CISH, a molecule with ubiquitin ligase activity, was found to be induced by T cell receptor ligation (TCR) and suppressed by targeting the critical signaling intermediate PLC-gamma-1. The deletion of CISH in effector T cells dramatically augments TCR signaling and subsequent effector cytokine release, proliferation and survival. The adoptive transfer of tumor-specific effector T cells knocked out or knocked down CISH, resulting in a significant increase in functional avidity and sustained tumor immunity. Surprisingly no changes in activity of STAT5, CISH's purported target. Thus CISH represents a new class of T-cell intrinsic immunologic checkpoints with the potential to enhance adoptive immunotherapies.

=== Combinations ===
Many cancer patients do not respond to immune checkpoint blockade. Response rate may be improved by combining that with additional therapies, including those that stimulate T cell infiltration. For example, targeted therapies such as radiotherapy, vasculature targeting agents, and immunogenic chemotherapy can improve immune checkpoint blockade response in animal models.

Combining immunotherapies such as PD1 and CTLA4 inhibitors can create to durable responses.

Combinatorial ablation and immunotherapy enhances the immunostimulating response and has synergistic effects for metastatic cancer treatment.

Combining checkpoint immunotherapies with pharmaceutical agents has the potential to improve response, and as of 2018 were a target of clinical investigation. Immunostimulatory drugs such as CSF-1R inhibitors and TLR agonists have been effective.

Two independent 2024 clinical trials reported that combinations of JAK inhibitors with anti–PD-1 immunotherapy could improve efficacy. A phase 2 trial investigated the combination as a first-line therapy for metastatic non-small-cell lung cancer. Administration of itacitinib after treatment with pembrolizumab improved therapeutic response. A separate phase 1/2 trial with patients with relapsed/refractory Hodgkin's lymphoma combined ruxolitinib and nivolumab, yielding improved clinical efficacy in patients who had previously failed checkpoint blockade immunotherapy.

== Cytokine therapy ==
Cytokines are proteins produced by many types of cells present within a tumor. They can modulate immune responses. The tumor often employs them to allow it to grow and reduce the immune response. These immune-modulating effects allow them to be used as drugs to provoke an immune response. Two commonly used cytokines are interferons and interleukins.

Interleukin-2 and interferon-α are cytokines, proteins that regulate and coordinate the behavior of the immune system. They have the ability to enhance anti-tumor activity and thus can be used as passive cancer treatments. Interferon-α is used in the treatment of hairy-cell leukaemia, AIDS-related Kaposi's sarcoma, follicular lymphoma, chronic myeloid leukaemia and melanoma. Interleukin-2 is used in the treatment of melanoma and renal cell carcinoma.

=== Interferon ===
Interferons are produced by the immune system. They are usually involved in anti-viral response, but also have use for cancer. They fall in three groups: type I (IFNα and IFNβ), type II (IFNγ) and type III (IFNλ). IFNα has been approved for use in hairy-cell leukaemia, AIDS-related Kaposi's sarcoma, follicular lymphoma, chronic myeloid leukaemia and melanoma. Type I and II IFNs have been researched extensively and although both types promote anti-tumor immune system effects, only type I IFNs have been shown to be clinically effective. IFNλ shows promise for its anti-tumor effects in animal models.

Unlike type I IFNs, Interferon gamma is not approved yet for the treatment of any cancer. However, improved survival was observed when Interferon gamma was administered to patients with bladder carcinoma and melanoma cancers. The most promising result was achieved in patients with stage 2 and 3 of ovarian carcinoma. The in vitro study of IFN-gamma in cancer cells is more extensive and results indicate anti-proliferative activity of IFN-gamma leading to the growth inhibition or cell death, generally induced by apoptosis but sometimes by autophagy.

=== Interleukin ===
Interleukins have an array of immune system effects. Interleukin-2 is used in the treatment of melanoma and renal cell carcinoma. In normal physiology it promotes both effector T cells and T-regulatory cells, but its exact mechanism of action is unknown.

== Predictive genetic testing ==
Due to the high cost of immunotherapy and the reluctance of insurers to pre-authorize treatment, various genetic and molecular tests have been developed to predict therapeutic response. Three major biomarkers are currently FDA-approved and widely used in clinical practice: (1) programmed death-ligand 1 (PD-L1) expression, (2) microsatellite instability (MSI) or mismatch repair deficiency (dMMR), and (3) tumor mutational burden (TMB).

PD-L1 expression, detected via immunohistochemistry, may indicate which tumors are more likely to respond to immune checkpoint inhibitors by revealing the presence of proteins that help cancer cells evade immune surveillance. However, its predictive value is limited by variability in expression across tumor types, locations, and testing platforms. MSI and dMMR, identified through molecular or immunohistochemical testing, indicate a deficiency in DNA repair mechanisms and are associated with high mutation rates that may increase tumor immunogenicity. These biomarkers have been approved to guide the use of checkpoint inhibitors in several cancer types. TMB, measured by next-generation sequencing, quantifies the total number of somatic mutations in a tumor genome. High TMB has been associated with improved responses to immunotherapy, although its clinical utility remains controversial and context-dependent. As of 2023, reliance on TMB as a selection criterion for immunotherapy was still debated in the scientific community.

In addition to these biomarkers, the FDA has approved certain drug-companion diagnostic pairings based on genetic mutations. For example, BRAF-targeted therapies for metastatic melanoma are only indicated for patients whose tumors harbor a BRAF mutation.

While these tests are now commonly marketed as essential tools for precision oncology, they remain costly. Moreover, some have been the subject of controversy or misuse. Notable examples include the Duke University cancer fraud scandal and questionable claims surrounding so-called "liquid biopsies."

== Research ==
=== Oncolytic virus ===
An oncolytic virus is a virus that preferentially infects and kills cancer cells. As the infected cancer cells are destroyed by oncolysis, they release new infectious virus particles or virions to help destroy the remaining tumour. Oncolytic viruses are thought not only to cause direct destruction of the tumour cells, but also to stimulate host anti-tumour immune responses for long-term immunotherapy.

The potential of viruses as anti-cancer agents was first realized in the early twentieth century, although coordinated research efforts did not begin until the 1960s. A number of viruses including adenovirus, reovirus, measles, herpes simplex, Newcastle disease virus and vaccinia have now been clinically tested as oncolytic agents. T-Vec is the first FDA-approved oncolytic virus for the treatment of melanoma. A number of other oncolytic viruses are in Phase II-III development.

=== Polysaccharides ===
Certain compounds found in mushrooms, primarily polysaccharides, can up-regulate the immune system and may have anti-cancer properties. For example, beta-glucans such as lentinan have been shown in laboratory studies to stimulate macrophage, NK cells, T cells and immune system cytokines and have been investigated in clinical trials as immunologic adjuvants.

=== Neoantigens ===
Many tumors express mutations. These mutations potentially create new targetable antigens (neoantigens) for use in T-cell immunotherapy. The presence of CD8+ T cells in cancer lesions, as identified using RNA sequencing data, is higher in tumors with a high mutational burden. The level of transcripts associated with the cytolytic activity of natural killer cells and T cells positively correlates with mutational load in many human tumors. In non–small cell lung cancer patients treated with lambrolizumab, mutational load shows a strong correlation with clinical response. In melanoma patients treated with ipilimumab, the long-term benefit is also associated with a higher mutational load, although less significantly. The predicted MHC binding neoantigens in patients with a long-term clinical benefit were enriched for a series of tetrapeptide motifs that were not found in tumors of patients with no or minimal clinical benefit. However, human neoantigens identified in other studies do not show the bias toward tetrapeptide signatures. Finally, effectiveness of neoantigens may also be regulated by the specific HLA repertoire possessed by specific patient sub-groups.

=== Polysaccharide-K ===
In the 1980s, Japan's Ministry of Health, Labour and Welfare approved polysaccharide-K extracted from the mushroom, Coriolus versicolor, to stimulate the immune systems of patients undergoing chemotherapy. It is a dietary supplement in the US and other jurisdictions.

=== Small molecule drugs ===
Small molecule drugs are also under development as cancer immunotherapeutic agents, offering potential advantages over traditional antibody-based therapies such as improved tissue penetration, oral bioavailability, and lower production costs. These molecules target key immune checkpoints and signaling pathways—including PD-1/PD-L1, STING, chemokine receptors, and negative regulators of T cell function—modulating the tumor microenvironment and enhancing anti-tumor immune responses. Notable candidates include BMS-202 and CA-170, which disrupt PD-1/PD-L1 interactions, and compounds targeting adenosine, prostaglandin, and innate immune pathways, many of which are advancing through clinical trials.

== Cancer resistance to immunotherapy ==
While immunotherapy has provided a tool for combating cancer, a significant clinical challenge comes with it. Cancer cells can develop resistance to immunotherapy treatment, which decreases the efficacy of the treatment. A substantial proportion of patients either begin treatment with resistance, causing failure in response, or develop resistance after the medication is administered. A recent review estimated that a majority of patients with solid tumors eventually acquire resistance to immunotherapy.

Resistance to immunotherapy falls under either the category of primary or innate resistance, which causes a lack of response to immunotherapy treatment from the get-go, or acquired resistance, where there is an initial positive response to treatment followed by regression. Resistance arises through mechanisms that alter the interaction between tumor cells, the immune system, and the tumor microenvironment.

Tumor antigenicity, or the ability for the immune system to recognize cancer cells, is a primary target for resistance. Resistance mutations that down-regulate (decrease) the expression of antigen-presenting factors allow the immune system to ignore the presence of cancer cells. The major histocompatibility complex (MHC), which presents antigens on the cell surface to prompt immune recognition, is often a target. When T cells can no longer identify malignant cells, this renders therapies and immune recognition useless.

A second mechanism of immunotherapy resistance is impaired immune cell function. Cancers are found to attract and rely on immune suppressors such as regulatory T cells or other cells in the tumor microenvironment to decrease the response of immune cells. Further, reducing the activity of cytotoxic T cells by sustaining expression of inhibitory receptors limits the effectiveness of immune checkpoint inhibitors.

Cancers can modify the tumor microenvironment itself, creating physical and biochemical barriers to immune attack. Abnormal vasculature is a prominent way of doing this. Tumors secrete factors that attract the growth of blood vessels (angiogenesis) that encourages further methods of nutrient transport, feeding the tumor. Additionally, cancer cells can produce nerve growth factor which causes healthy neurons to develop around and within tumors. This is promotes further tumor growth because nerves produce neurotransmitters 5HT that prompt tumor cell proliferation. Essentially solid tumors are able to create networks of feedback loops, hijacking healthy cells.

== See also ==
- Cancer vaccine
- Antigen 5T4
- Coley's toxins
- Combinatorial ablation and immunotherapy
- Cryoimmunotherapy
- Photoimmunotherapy
- Radioimmunotherapy
