= Erfonrilimab =

Monoclonal antibody

Monoclonal antibody
- Type: F(ab')_{2} fragment
- Target: CTLA-4, PD-L1

Clinical data
- Drug class: Antineoplastic agent
- ATC code: L01FF05 (WHO)

Identifiers
- CAS Number: 2367013-69-0
- PubChem CID: 440235329
- UNII: 9NP50O6YSA

Erfonrilimab is a investigational drug being evaluated for use in cancer immunotherapy. It is a bispecific antibody targeting PD-L1 and CTLA-4.
