= Adebrelimab =

Monoclonal antibody

Monoclonal antibody
- Type: Whole antibody
- Source: Humanized (from mouse)
- Target: PD-L1

Clinical data
- Drug class: Antineoplastic agent
- ATC code: L01FF05 (WHO)

Legal status
- Legal status: Rx in China

Identifiers
- CAS Number: 2247114-85-6
- PubChem SID: 472411821
- UNII: 1XBY50W1OX

Adebrelimab is a drug that is being evaluated for the treatment of solid tumors. Adebrelimab is recombinant humanized IgG4 monoclonal antibody with specificity for PD-L1.

In 2023, adebrelimab was approved for use in China for the treatment of small cell lung cancer.
