= C25H29N3O3 =

The molecular formula C_{25}H_{29}N_{3}O_{3} may refer to:

- Adimolol
- BMS-202
