= CA-170 =

Identifiers
- IUPAC name: (2S,3R)-2-[[(1S)-3-amino-1-[3-[(1R)-1-amino-2-hydroxyethyl]-1,2,4-oxadiazol-5-yl]-3-oxopropyl]carbamoylamino]-3-hydroxybutanoic acid
- CAS Number: 1673534-76-3
- PubChem CID: 126843231
- DrugBank: DB15772
- ChemSpider: 68025713
- UNII: 646MN6KQ16
- ChEMBL: ChEMBL5411171

Chemical and physical data
- Formula: C_{12}H_{20}N_{6}O_{7}
- Molar mass: 360.327 g·mol^{−1}
- 3D model (JSmol): Interactive image
- SMILES: C[C@H]([C@@H](C(=O)O)NC(=O)N[C@@H](CC(=O)N)C1=NC(=NO1)[C@H](CO)N)O
- InChI: InChI=1S/C12H20N6O7/c1-4(20)8(11(22)23)16-12(24)15-6(2-7(14)21)10-17-9(18-25-10)5(13)3-19/h4-6,8,19-20H,2-3,13H2,1H3,(H2,14,21)(H,22,23)(H2,15,16,24)/t4-,5+,6+,8+/m1/s1; Key:HFOBENSCBRZVSP-LKXGYXEUSA-N

CA-170 is an investigational new drug being evaluated as an immune checkpoint inhibitor for the treatment of cancer. Developed by Aurigene Oncology, it is an orally available small molecule designed to selectively inhibit the immune checkpoint proteins PD-L1 and VISTA.
