= Photoimmunotherapy =

- Specialty: Oncology

Photoimmunotherapy (PIT) is an oncological treatment that combines photodynamic therapy of tumor with immunotherapy treatment. Combining photodynamic therapy with immunotherapy enhances the immunostimulating response and has synergistic effects for metastatic cancer treatment.

PIT is type of molecular targeted cancer therapy, which allows the selective destruction of cancer cells without any damage to normal tissues. It is a light-based cancer therapy, which was developed and pioneered by Professor Julia Levy and colleagues at the University of British Columbia, Canada, in 1983. Professor Julia Levy's research has also been pivotal in the clinical approval of Visudyne and Photofrin. Over the last 35 years, PIT has been studied extensively in vitro and in vivo by numerous research teams all over the world. More recently, significant strides in PIT have been made by Professor Kobayashi and his colleagues at National Cancer Institute, Bethesda, Maryland.

Conventional photodynamic therapy (PDT) uses a non-specific photosensitizer which can be activated by a non-ionizing light to kill cancer cells. Photosensitizers are molecules that rapidly destroy cells through the production of reactive oxygen species (ROS) when exposed to light at specific wavelength. However, this PDT treatment results in serious side effects because non-targeted photosensitizers are also taken up by normal tissues.

PIT treatment avoids the side effects problem through the creation of a targeted-photosensitizer, which involves two components: a monoclonal antibody (mAb) which recognizes specific proteins on the surface of cancer cells, and a non-targeted photosensitizer. Even though the new mAb-based photosensitizers are distributed throughout the body, it can be activated by light for targeted PIT only when bound to specific proteins on cancer cellular membrane.

PIT has been previously published using a vast number of photosensitizers, such as porphyrins, chlorins and phthalocyanine dyes. The research team at Professor Kobayashi's lab coupled anti-tumor antibodies targeting human epidermal growth factor receptors to a water soluble phthalocyanine dye, IRDye 700DX, which is activated by near-infrared light. IRDye 700DX was chosen for its hydrophilicity and strong cytotoxicity induced upon association with the cellular membrane and subsequent activation. A variety of cancers, such as breast and pancreatic cancers over-express epidermal growth factor receptors. This new photosensitizing compound utilizing IRDye 700DX NHS Ester was referred to as "mAb-IR700 conjugates".

In vitro studies showed that mAb-IR700 killed tumor cells seconds after the near-infrared light irradiation. There was also a positive correlation between the intensity of excitation light and percentage of cell death. Infrared light alone or mAb-IR700 conjugate alone did not cause any damage to normal cells. When tumor-xenografted mice were treated with mAb-IR700 and near-infrared light, significant tumor shrinkage was observed. With fractionated administration of mAB–IR700 conjugate followed by systematic repeated NIR light irradiation to the tumor, 80 percent of tumor cells were eradicated and the mice's survival were significantly prolonged. Based on the current hypothesis, cell death induced by PIT was caused by rapid expansion of local water upon the formation of holes in the membrane.

Another desirable feature of PIT using mAb-IR700 conjugate is that it also emits fluorescence light upon activation. Therefore before PIT, mAb-IR700 can be administered at a lower dosage to guide the application of excitation light to tumor tissues, further minimizing unnecessary light exposure to surrounding tissues.

PIT is a "highly selective and clinically feasible therapeutic method", believed to possess potential for effective treatment of mAb-binding tumors with minimal off-target effects. For future directions, researchers are trying to conjugate a variety of other monoclonal antibodies to phthalocyanine, creating a highly flexible therapeutic platform.

== See also ==
- Combinatorial ablation and immunotherapy
- Cryoimmunotherapy

== Bibliography ==
- Kobayashi, Hisataka. "Illuminating the cancer-targeting potential of near-infrared photoimmunotherapy."
- Sato, Kazuhide; et al. (May 2014). "Photoimmunotherapy: comparative effectiveness of two monoclonal antibodies targeting the epidermal growth factor receptor". Molecular Oncology. 8 (3): 620–632. doi:10.1016/j.molonc.2014.01.006. PMC 4004687. PMID 24508062.
