= Julia Levy =

Canadian microbiologist, immunologist, educator and entrepreneur (1934–2024)

- Born: Julia Coppens; May 13, 1934; Singapore
- Died: December 5, 2024 (aged 90); Lund, British Columbia, Canada
- Awards: Fellow Royal Society of Canada

Academic background
- Education: University of British Columbia; University of London

Academic work
- Institutions: University of British Columbia; QLT PhotoTherapeutics
- Main interests: microbiology
- Notable works: Photofrin

Julia Levy (May 15, 1934 – December 5, 2024) was a Canadian microbiologist, immunologist, educator and entrepreneur.

== Early life and education ==
The daughter of Guillaume Albert and Dorothy Frances Coppens, she was born Julia Coppens in Singapore. In 1940, her father sent her mother and his two daughters from their home in Indonesia to Vancouver, British Columbia, where he joined them at the end of World War II after he was released from a Japanese prisoner of war camp. Her early education was in Canada. She studied immunology and bacteriology at the University of British Columbia, earning a BA in 1955. Levy received a PhD in experimental pathology from the University of London in 1958. In 1959, she returned to the University of British Columbia as an assistant professor, later becoming full professor.

== Career ==
Her research led her and her colleagues to participate in the development of photodynamic therapy (PDT) initially for treating cancer but more significantly as the first medical treatment of one of the leading causes of blindness among the elderly, age-related macular degeneration (AMD). In 1984, she joined the four founding members at biopharmaceutical company Quadra Logic Technologies (later QLT Inc.). The PDT drug Photofrin was approved by the Canadian government for treatment of bladder cancer in 1993. Subsequently, it has been approved in the United States and elsewhere for the treatment of several other types of cancer.

In the mid-1980s she and colleagues discovered the PDT agent, verteporfin, which QLT and its partner CIBA Vision (now Novartis Ophthalmalics) developed as Visudyne, a treatment for AMD. Visudyne was approved by the US FDA in 2000 and throughout the world thereafter. For ophthalmologists, this therapy added "a technique to their treatment armamentarium for some lesions for which there has been no other proven treatment."

Initially Levy was Chief Scientific Officer of QLT, and from 1995 to 2001 she was chief executive officer and President of QLT. As a result of the success of Visudyne, QLT became one of the 21% of biotechnology companies that were profitable in the year 2000.

She has expanded her methodology to treat HIV/AIDS, arthritis and age-related macular degeneration.

== Honours and awards ==
Levy was named a fellow in the Royal Society of Canada in 1980, Pacific Canada Entrepreneur of the Year in 2000 and an Officer in the Order of Canada in 2001. She has received the Future of Vision Award from the Foundation Fighting Blindness, the Helen Keller Award for Contributions to Vision and the Lifetime Achievement Award from the British Columbia Biotechnology Association. She has also received a number of honorary doctorates from Canadian universities.

The Chemical Institute of Canada awards the Julia Levy Award for successful commercialization of innovation in the field of biomedical science and engineering.

== Personal life and death ==
She married Edwin Levy; the couple have two children.

Levy died on December 5, 2024, at the age of 90.
