= Cryoimmunotherapy =

Treatment for various types of cancer

Cryoimmunotherapy, also referred to as cryoimmunology, is an oncological treatment for various cancers that combines cryoablation of tumor with immunotherapy treatment. In-vivo cryoablation of a tumor, alone, can induce an immunostimulatory, systemic anti-tumor response, resulting in a cancer vaccine—the abscopal effect. Thus, cryoablation of tumors is a way of achieving autologous, in-vivo tumor lysate vaccine and treat metastatic disease. However, cryoablation alone may produce an insufficient immune response, depending on various factors, such as high freeze rate. Combining cryotherapy with immunotherapy enhances the immunostimulating response and has synergistic effects for cancer treatment.

Although, cryoablation and immunotherapy has been used successfully in oncological clinical practice for over 100 years, and can treat metastatic disease with curative intent, it has been ignored in modern practice. Only recently has cryoimmunotherapy been resurrected to become an established cancer treatment for all stages of disease.

== History ==
Immunological effects resulting from the cryoablation of tumors was first observed in the 1960s. Since the 1960s, Tanaka treated metastatic breast cancer patients with cryotherapy and reported cryoimmunological reaction resulting from cryotherapy. In the 1970s, systemic immunological response from local cryoablation of prostate cancer was also clinically observed. In the 1980s, Tanaka, of Japan, continued to advance the clinical practice of cryoimmunology with combination treatments including: cryochemotherapy and cryoimmunotherapy. In 1997, Russian scientists confirmed the efficacy of cryoimmunotherapy in inhibiting metastases in advanced cancer. In 2000s, China, following closely with the exciting developments, enthusiastically embraced cryoablation treatment for cancer and has been leading the practice ever since with cryoimmunotherapy treatments available for cancer patients in numerous hospitals and medical clinics throughout China. In the 2010s, American researchers and medical professionals, started to explore cryoimmunotherapy for systemic treatment of cancer.

== Mechanisms of actions ==
Cryoablation of tumor induces necrosis of tumor cells. The immunotherapeutic effect of cryoablation of tumor is the result of the release of intracellular tumor antigens from within the necrotized tumor cells. The released tumor antigens help activate anti-tumor T cells, which destroy remaining malignant cells. Thus, cryoablation of tumor elicits a systemic anti-tumor immunologic response.

The resulting immunostimulation from cryoablation may not be sufficient to induce sustained, systemic regression of metastases, and can be synergised with the combination of immunotherapy treatment and vaccine adjuvants.

Various adjuvant immunotherapy and chemotherapy treatments can be combined with cryoablation to sustain systemic anti-tumor response with regression of metastases, including:

- Injection of immunomodulating drugs (i.e.: therapeutic antibodies) and vaccine adjuvants (saponins) directly into the cryoablated, necrotized tumor lysate, immediately after cryoablation
- Administration of autologous immune enhancement therapy, including: dendritic cell therapy, CIK cell therapy

== See also ==
- Combinatorial ablation and immunotherapy
- Photoimmunotherapy
