= SLAMF7 =

Protein-coding gene in humans

Identifiers
- Aliases: SLAMF7, 19A, CD319, CRACC, CS1, SLAM family member 7
- External IDs: OMIM: 606625; MGI: 1922595; GeneCards: SLAMF7

Gene location (Human)
Chr.	Chromosome 1 (human)
Band	1q23.3	Start	160,739,057 bp
Band	1q23.3	End	160,754,821 bp

Gene location (Mouse)
Chr.	Chromosome 1 (mouse)
Band	1|1 H3	Start	171,459,971 bp
Band	1|1 H3	End	171,480,603 bp
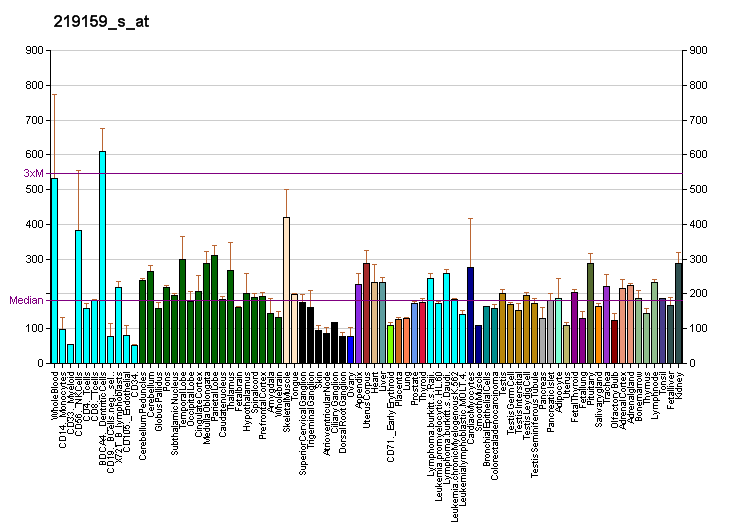
RNA expression pattern
Bgee	Human / Mouse (ortholog); Top expressed in: granulocyte; lymph node; epithelium of colon; rectum; mucosa of sigmoid colon; bone marrow cell; spleen; monocyte; palpebral conjunctiva; blood / Top expressed in: interventricular septum; spermatocyte; spermatid; seminiferous tubule; spleen; mesenteric lymph nodes; granulocyte; zygote; right kidney; thymus; More reference expression data
BioGPS	More reference expression data
Gene ontology
Molecular function	identical protein binding
Cellular component	integral component of membrane; plasma membrane; membrane
Biological process	cell adhesion; natural killer cell activation; innate immune response; adaptive immune response; natural killer cell mediated cytotoxicity; regulation of immune response; immune system process
Sources:Amigo / QuickGO
Orthologs
Databases	NCBI: entry; OMA: entry
Species	Human	Mouse
Entrez	57823	75345
Ensembl	ENSG00000026751	ENSMUSG00000038179
UniProt	Q9NQ25	Q8BHK6
RefSeq (mRNA)	NM_001282588; NM_001282589; NM_001282590; NM_001282591; NM_001282592 NM_001282593; NM_001282594; NM_001282595; NM_001282596; NM_021181	NM_144539; NM_001347184
RefSeq (protein)	NP_001269517; NP_001269518; NP_001269519; NP_001269520; NP_001269521 NP_001269522; NP_001269523; NP_001269524; NP_001269525; NP_067004	NP_001334113; NP_653122
Location (UCSC)	Chr 1: 160.74 – 160.75 Mb	Chr 1: 171.46 – 171.48 Mb
PubMed search
- Wikidata
View/Edit Human	View/Edit Mouse

SLAM family member 7 is a protein that, in humans, is encoded by the SLAMF7 gene.

The surface antigen CD319 (SLAMF7) is a robust marker of normal plasma cells and malignant plasma cells in multiple myeloma. In contrast to CD138 (the traditional plasma cell marker), CD319/SLAMF7 is much more stable and allows robust isolation of malignant plasma cells from delayed or even cryopreserved samples.

Elotuzumab is a monoclonal antibody medication that targets this protein.
