= BMS-202 =

Anti-tumour drug

Clinical data
- ATC code: none

Legal status
- Legal status: Investigational

Identifiers
- IUPAC name: N-(2-(((2-methoxy-6-((2-methyl-[1,1'-biphenyl]-3-yl)methoxy)pyridin-3-yl)methyl)amino)ethyl)acetamide
- CAS Number: 1675203-84-5
- PubChem CID: 117951478
- IUPHAR/BPS: 9607
- ChemSpider: 45743495
- UNII: KDA2HUE7KP
- ChEMBL: ChEMBL4089730

Chemical and physical data
- Formula: C_{25}H_{29}N_{3}O_{3}
- Molar mass: 419.525 g·mol^{−1}
- 3D model (JSmol): Interactive image
- SMILES: CC1=C(C=CC=C1C2=CC=CC=C2)COC3=NC(=C(C=C3)CNCCNC(=O)C)OC
- InChI: InChI=1S/C25H29N3O3/c1-18-22(10-7-11-23(18)20-8-5-4-6-9-20)17-31-24-13-12-21(25(28-24)30-3)16-26-14-15-27-19(2)29/h4-13,26H,14-17H2,1-3H3,(H,27,29); Key:JEDPSOYOYVELLZ-UHFFFAOYSA-N

BMS-202 is a small-molecule drug PD-L1 inhibitor developed by Bristol-Myers Squibb which displays significant anti-tumor activity against glioblastoma (GBM) cells. In addition, BMS-202 has an inhibitory effect on both PD-L1-expressing cancer cells and activated T cells.
