= PD-L1 =

Mammalian protein found in humans

CD274
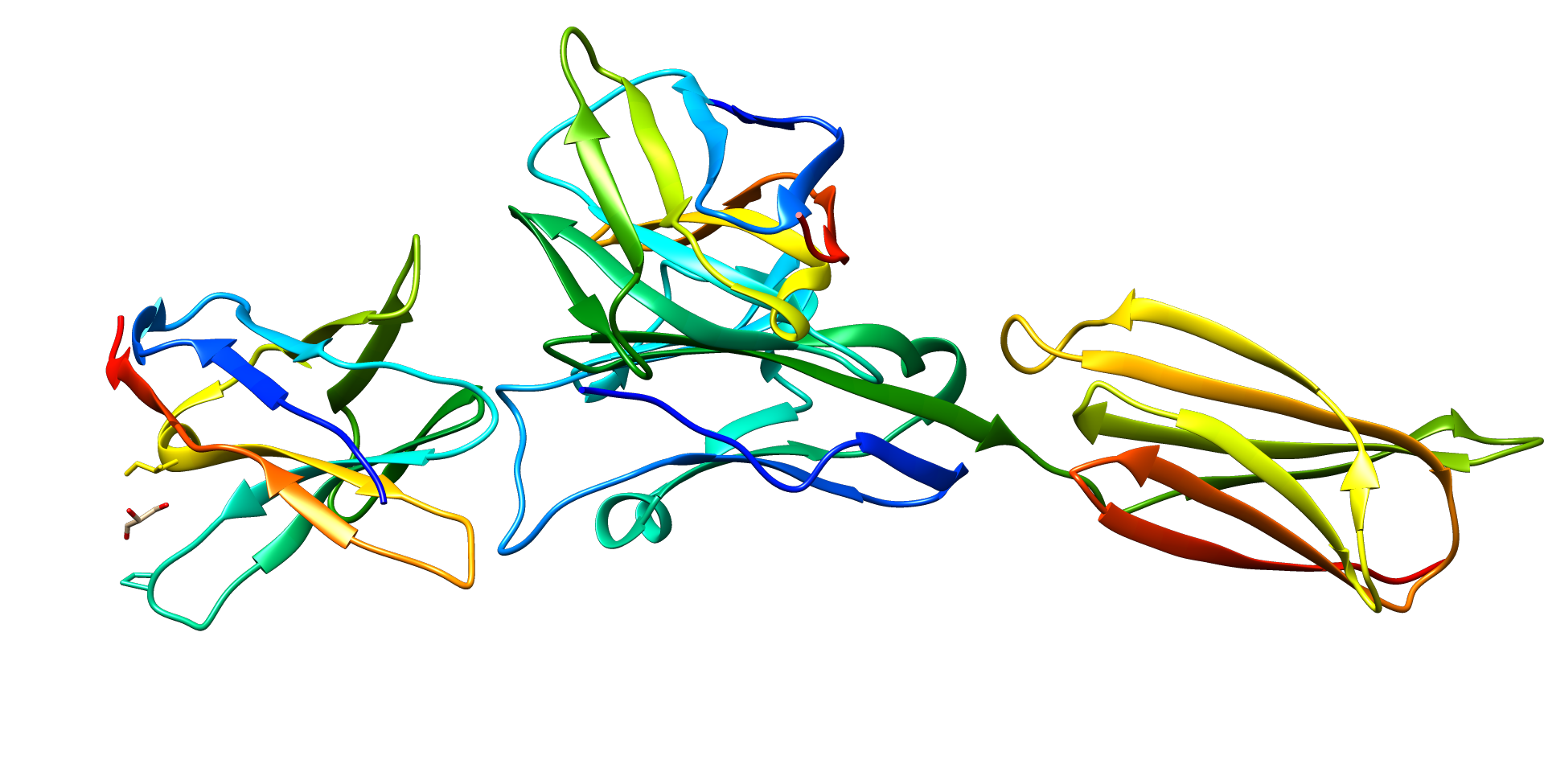

Identifiers
- Aliases: CD274, B7-H, B7H1, PD-L1, PDCD1L1, PDCD1LG1, PDL1, CD274 molecule, Programmed cell death ligand 1, hPD-L1
- External IDs: OMIM: 605402; MGI: 1926446; GeneCards: CD274
Available structures
PDB	Ortholog search: PDBe RCSB
PDB	List of PDB id codes 3BIK, 3BIS, 3FN3, 3SBW, 4Z18, 4ZQK, 5C3T, 5J89, 5J8O

Gene location (Human)
Chr.	Chromosome 9 (human)
Band	9p24.1	Start	5,450,503 bp
Band	9p24.1	End	5,470,566 bp

Gene location (Mouse)
Chr.	Chromosome 19 (mouse)
Band	19|19 C1	Start	29,344,855 bp
Band	19|19 C1	End	29,365,495 bp
RNA expression pattern
Bgee	Human / Mouse (ortholog); Top expressed in: cartilage tissue; placenta; lower lobe of lung; pancreatic epithelial cell; upper lobe of left lung; right lung; myocardium of left ventricle; appendix; pancreatic ductal cell; testicle / Top expressed in: mesenteric lymph nodes; subcutaneous adipose tissue; iris; thymus; brown adipose tissue; blood; spleen; tunica adventitia of aorta; granulocyte; ciliary body; More reference expression data
BioGPS	n/a
Gene ontology
Molecular function	protein binding
Cellular component	integral component of membrane; membrane; cell surface; extracellular exosome; external side of plasma membrane; endomembrane system; plasma membrane; early endosome membrane; recycling endosome membrane; endosome
Biological process	negative regulation of interleukin-10 production; response to cytokine; negative regulation of interferon-gamma production; negative regulation of tumor necrosis factor superfamily cytokine production; positive regulation of cell migration; T cell costimulation; toxin transport; negative regulation of activated T cell proliferation; regulation of activated T cell proliferation; cell surface receptor signaling pathway; negative regulation of T cell proliferation; regulation of T cell apoptotic process; immune response; positive regulation of T cell proliferation; signal transduction; regulation of activated CD4-positive, alpha-beta T cell apoptotic process; positive regulation of activated CD8-positive, alpha-beta T cell apoptotic process; positive regulation of tolerance induction to tumor cell; negative regulation of CD8-positive, alpha-beta T cell activation; immune system process; negative regulation of CD4-positive, alpha-beta T cell proliferation; cellular response to lipopolysaccharide; adaptive immune response
Sources:Amigo / QuickGO
Orthologs
Databases	NCBI: entry; OMA: entry
Species	Human	Mouse
Entrez	29126	60533
Ensembl	ENSG00000120217	ENSMUSG00000016496
UniProt	Q9NZQ7	Q9EP73
RefSeq (mRNA)	NM_001314029; NM_001267706; NM_014143	NM_021893
RefSeq (protein)	NP_001254635; NP_001300958; NP_054862	NP_068693
Location (UCSC)	Chr 9: 5.45 – 5.47 Mb	Chr 19: 29.34 – 29.37 Mb
PubMed search
- Wikidata
View/Edit Human	View/Edit Mouse

Programmed death-ligand 1 (PD-L1) also known as cluster of differentiation 274 (CD274) or B7 homolog 1 (B7-H1) is a protein that in humans is encoded by the CD274 gene.

Programmed death-ligand 1 (PD-L1) is a 40kDa type 1 transmembrane protein that has been speculated to play a major role in suppressing the adaptive arm of immune systems during particular events such as pregnancy, tissue allografts, autoimmune disease and other disease states such as hepatitis. Normally the adaptive immune system reacts to antigens that are associated with immune system activation by exogenous or endogenous danger signals. In turn, clonal expansion of antigen-specific CD8+ T cells and/or CD4+ helper cells is propagated. The binding of PD-L1 to the inhibitory checkpoint molecule PD-1 transmits an inhibitory signal based on interaction with phosphatases (SHP-1 or SHP-2) via Immunoreceptor Tyrosine-Based Switch Motif (ITSM). This reduces the proliferation of antigen-specific T-cells in lymph nodes, while simultaneously reducing apoptosis in regulatory T cells (anti-inflammatory, suppressive T cells) – further mediated by a lower regulation of the gene Bcl-2. PD-L1 is expressed on both hematopoietic and nonhematopoietic cells in tissues. However, the exact roles of PD-L1 on hematopoietic versus nonhematopoietic cells in modulating immune responses are unclear.

In an ancestor of tetrapod species, PD-L1 and PD-L2 arose from a gene duplication. Both PD-L1 and PD-L2 can bind PD-1. While across mammals the PD-L1 and PD-L2 molecules also show consistent differences in the membrane-distal IgV domain, across tetrapod species they only show consistent differences in their membrane-proximal IgC domain (see Figure 3).

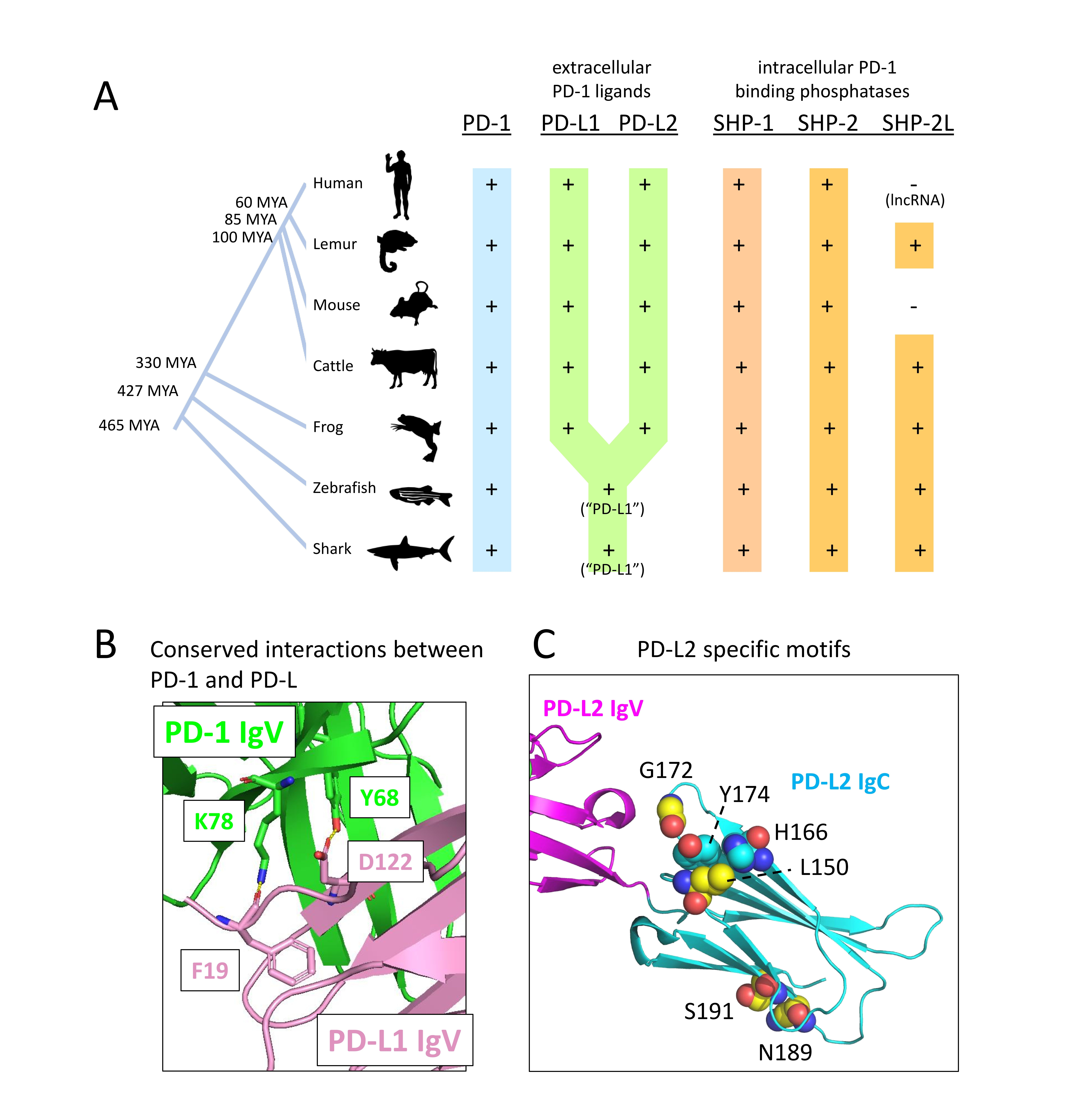
Figure 3. Evolution of PD-1 and its interacting molecules.

== History ==
PD-L1 also known as B7-H1 was characterized at the Mayo Clinic in 1999 as an immune regulatory molecule. At that time, it was concluded that B7-H1 helps tumor cells evade anti-tumor immunity. In 2003, B7-H1 was shown to be expressed on myeloid cells as checkpoint protein and was proposed as potential target in cancer immunotherapy in human clinic.

== Binding ==
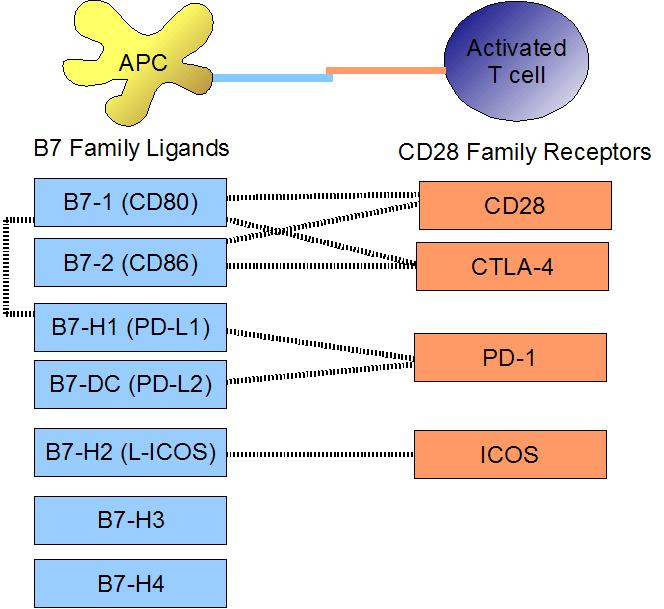
Binding interactions

PD-L1 binds to its receptor, PD-1, found on activated T cells, B cells, and myeloid cells, to modulate activation or inhibition. The affinity between PD-L1 and PD-1, as defined by the dissociation constant K_{d}, is 770 nM. PD-L1 also has an appreciable affinity for the costimulatory molecule CD80 (B7-1), but not CD86 (B7-2). CD80's affinity for PD-L1, 1.4 μM, is intermediate between its affinity for CD28 and CTLA-4 (4.0 μM and 400 nM, respectively). The related molecule PD-L2 has no such affinity for CD80 or CD86, but shares PD-1 as a receptor (with a stronger K_{d} of 140 nM). Said et al. showed that PD-1, up-regulated on activated CD4 T-cells, can bind to PD-L1 expressed on monocytes and induces IL-10 production by the latter.

== Signaling ==
Engagement of PD-L1 with its receptor PD-1 on T cells delivers a signal that inhibits TCR-mediated activation of IL-2 production and T cell proliferation. The mechanism involves inhibition of ZAP70 phosphorylation and its association with CD3ζ. PD-1 signaling attenuates PKC-θ activation loop phosphorylation (resulting from TCR signaling), necessary for the activation of transcription factors NF-κB and AP-1, and for production of IL-2. PD-L1 binding to PD-1 also contributes to ligand-induced TCR down-modulation during antigen presentation to naive T cells, by inducing the up-regulation of the E3 ubiquitin ligase CBL-b.

== Regulation ==
=== By interferons ===
Upon IFN-γ stimulation, PD-L1 is expressed on T cells, NK cells, macrophages, myeloid DCs, B cells, epithelial cells, and vascular endothelial cells. The PD-L1 gene promoter region has a response element to IRF-1, the interferon regulatory factor. Type I interferons can also upregulate PD-L1 on murine hepatocytes, monocytes, DCs, and tumor cells.

=== On macrophages and monocytes ===
PD-L1 is notably expressed on macrophages. In the mouse, it has been shown that classically activated macrophages (induced by type I helper T cells, a combination of LPS and interferon-gamma, or even dendritic cell vaccines) greatly upregulate PD-L1. Alternatively, macrophages activated by IL-4 (alternative macrophages), slightly upregulate PD-L1, while greatly upregulating PD-L2. It has been shown by STAT1-deficient knock-out mice that STAT1 is mostly responsible for upregulation of PD-L1 on macrophages by LPS or interferon-gamma, but is not at all responsible for its constitutive expression before activation in these mice. It was also shown that PD-L1 is constituvely expressed on mouse Ly6C^{lo} nonclassical monocytes in steady state. Moreover, PD-L1+ macrophages might also show cross-organ enrichment (e.g., lymph node as well as peripheral diseased tissues like tumours) and exert potent hostility against CD8+T cells thereby compromising T cell's disease ameliorating activity e.g., anticancer immune reactions.

=== Role of microRNAs ===
Resting human cholangiocytes express PD-L1 mRNA, but not the protein, due to translational suppression by microRNA miR-513. Upon treatment with interferon-gamma, miR-513 was down-regulated, thereby lifting suppression of PD-L1 protein. In this way, interferon-gamma can induce PD-L1 protein expression by inhibiting gene-mediated suppression of mRNA translation. Whereas the Epstein-Barr viral (EBV) latent membrane protein-1 (LMP1) is a known potent inducer of PD-L1, the EBV miRNA miR-BamH1 fragment H rightward open reading frame 1 (BHRF1) 2-5p has been shown to regulate LMP1 induced PD-L1 expression.

=== Epigenetic regulation ===
PD-L1 promoter DNA methylation may predict survival in some cancers after surgery.

== Clinical significance ==
=== Cancer ===
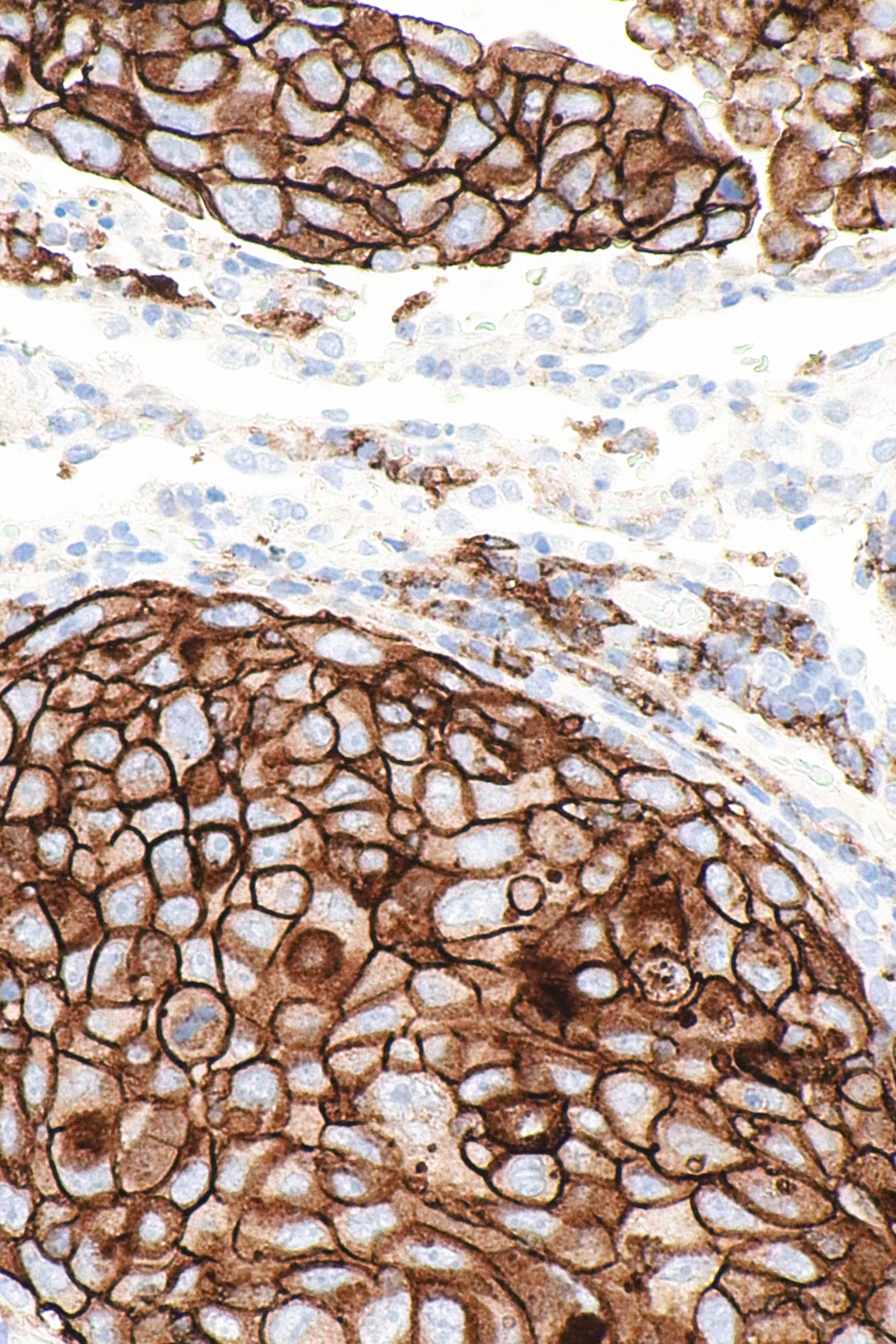
Micrograph showing a PD-L1 positive lung adenocarcinoma. PD-L1 immunostain

PD-L1 is shown to be highly expressed in a variety of malignancies, particularly lung cancer. In order to anticipate the effectiveness of gene therapy or systemic immunotherapy in blocking the PD-1 and PD-L1 checkpoints, PD-L1 might be employed as a prognostic marker and a target for anti-cancer immunity. i.e. upregulation of PD-L1 may allow cancers to evade the host immune system. For example, an analysis of 196 tumor specimens from patients with renal cell carcinoma found that high tumor expression of PD-L1 was associated with increased tumor aggressiveness and a 4.5-fold increased risk of death. In a model of A20 leukemia cells injected into F1 mice, NK cells killed target tumor cells with similar efficiency regardless of PD-L1 expression, whereas PD-L1 expression on A20 tumor cells conferred significant tumor protection against rejection by CD8 T cells confirming the role of the co-inhibitory receptor PD-1 in the modulation of their cytotoxic activity.

Many PD-L1 inhibitors are in development as immuno-oncology therapies and are showing good results in clinical trials. Clinically available examples include durvalumab, atezolizumab and avelumab. In normal tissue, feedback between transcription factors like STAT3 and NF-κB restricts the immune response to protect host tissue and limit inflammation. In cancer, loss of feedback restriction between transcription factors can lead to increased local PD-L1 expression, which could limit the effectiveness of systemic treatment with agents targeting PD-L1. CAR-T and NK cells targeting PD-L1 are being evaluated for treating cancer. pSTAT-1 and PDL-1 expressions also strongly correlate in prostate cancer.

Upregulation of PD-L1 on immune cells (especially myeloid cells and macrophages) can also lead to formation of an immunosuppressive environment in a highly localized manner that also allow the cancer cells to proliferate or cause direct deletion of anticancer CD8+ T cells.

PD-L1 analysis in TNBC is essential for selecting patients eligible for immunotherapy. Inter-observer and intra-observer agreement among the pathologists were found to be substantial. Cases around the 1% cut-off value are specifically challenging.

=== Listeria monocytogenes ===
In a mouse model of intracellular infection, L. monocytogenes induced PD-L1 protein expression in T cells, NK cells, and macrophages. PD-L1 blockade (using blocking antibodies) resulted in increased mortality for infected mice. Blockade reduced TNFα and nitric oxide production by macrophages, reduced granzyme B production by NK cells, and decreased proliferation of L. monocytogenes antigen-specific CD8 T cells (but not CD4 T cells). This evidence suggests that PD-L1 acts as a positive costimulatory molecule in intracellular infection.

=== Autoimmunity ===
PD-1/PD-L1 interaction is thought to play a role in preventing destructive autoimmunity, especially during inflammatory conditions. The best example is in the stomach, where PD-1 expression protects the gastrin expressing G-cells from the immune system during Helicobacter pylori-provoked inflammation. However, a variety of pre-clinical studies also support the notion that the PD-1/PD-L1 interaction is implicated in autoimmunity. NOD mice, an animal model for autoimmunity that exhibit a susceptibility to spontaneous development of type I diabetes and other autoimmune diseases, have been shown to develop precipitated onset of diabetes from blockade of PD-1 or PD-L1 (but not PD-L2).

In humans, PD-L1 was found to have altered expression in pediatric patients with systemic lupus erythematosus (SLE). Studying isolated PBMC from healthy children, immature myeloid dendritic cells and monocytes expressed little PD-L1 at initial isolation, but spontaneously up-regulated PD-L1 by 24 hours. In contrast, both mDC and monocytes from patients with active SLE failed to upregulate PD-L1 over a 5-day time course, expressing this protein only during disease remissions. This may be one mechanism whereby peripheral tolerance is lost in SLE.

== See also ==
- Cluster of differentiation
- Co-stimulation
- Immune tolerance
