= PD-1 and PD-L1 inhibitors =

Class of anticancer drugs

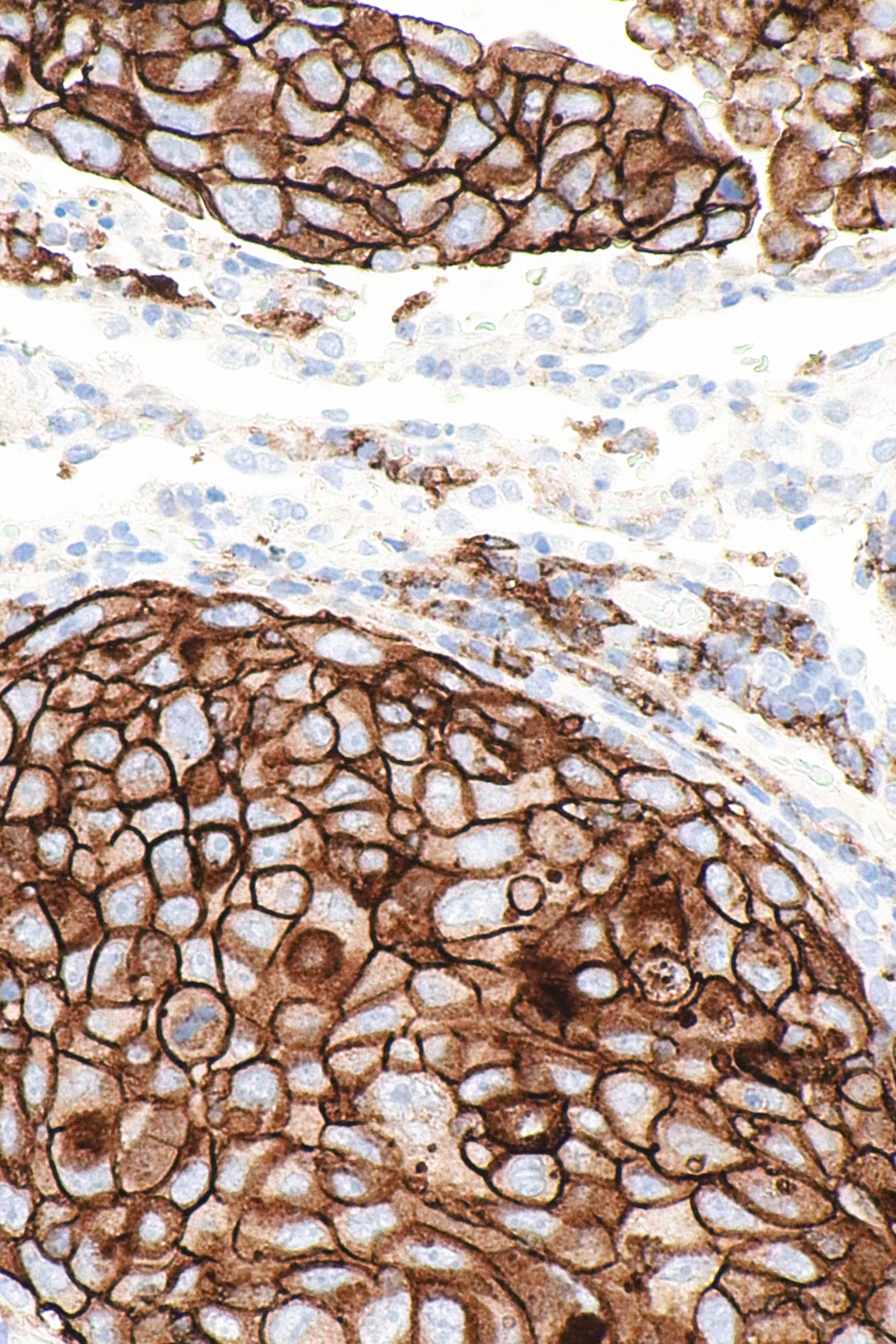
Micrograph showing a PD-L1 positive lung adenocarcinoma. Positive immunostaining can predict response to the treatment.

PD-1 inhibitors and PD-L1 inhibitors are a group of checkpoint inhibitor anticancer drugs that block the activity of PD-1 and PD-L1 immune checkpoint proteins present on the surface of cells. Immune checkpoint inhibitors are emerging as a front-line treatment for several types of cancer.

PD-1 and PD-L1 inhibitors act to inhibit the association of the programmed death-ligand 1 (PD-L1) with its receptor, programmed cell death protein 1 (PD-1). The interaction of these cell surface proteins is involved in the suppression of the immune system and occurs following infection to limit the killing of bystander host cells and prevent autoimmune disease. This immune checkpoint is also active in pregnancy, following tissue allografts, and in different types of cancer.

Approved PD-1/PD-L1 inhibitors
Name	Target	Approved
Nivolumab	PD-1	2014
Pembrolizumab	PD-1	2014
Atezolizumab	PD-L1	2016
Avelumab	PD-L1	2017
Durvalumab	PD-L1	2017
Cemiplimab	PD-1	2018
Tislelizumab	PD-1	2019
Dostarlimab	PD-1	2021
Retifanlimab	PD-1	2023
Toripalimab	PD-1	2023
Cosibelimab	PD-L1	2024

== History ==
The concept of blocking PD-1 and PD-L1 for the treatment of cancer was first published in 2001. Pharmaceutical companies began attempting to develop drugs to block these molecules, and the first clinical trial was launched in 2006, evaluating nivolumab. As of 2017, more than 500 clinical trials involving PD-1 and PD-L1 inhibitors have been conducted in more than 20,000 patients. By the end of 2017, PD-1/PD-L1 inhibitors had been approved for the treatment of nine forms of cancer.

== Cancer immunotherapy ==
In the cancer disease state, the interaction of PD-L1 on the tumor cells with PD-1 on a T-cell reduces T-cell function signals to prevent the immune system from attacking the tumor cells. Use of an inhibitor that blocks the interaction of PD-L1 with the PD-1 receptor can prevent the cancer from evading the immune system in this way. Several PD-1 and PD-L1 inhibitors are being trialled within the clinic for use in advanced melanoma, non-small cell lung cancer, renal cell carcinoma, bladder cancer and Hodgkin lymphoma, amongst other cancer types.

Immunotherapy with these immune checkpoint inhibitors appears to shrink tumours in a higher number of patients across a wider range of tumour types and is associated with lower toxicity levels than other immunotherapies, with durable responses. However, de-novo and acquired resistance is still seen in a large proportion of patients. Hence PD-L1 inhibitors are considered to be the most promising drug category for many different cancers.

Not all patients respond to PD-1/PD-L1 inhibitors. The FDA has approved several assays to measure the level of PD-L1 expressed by tumor cells, in order to predict the likelihood of response to an inhibitor. PD-L1 levels have been found to be highly predictive of response. Higher tumor mutational burden is also predictive of response to anti-PD-1/PD-L1 agents. However, these markers are far from perfect, and there is a clinical interest in the search for new biomarkers predictive of the benefit of these therapies beyond PD-L1 and TMB levels. Emerging evidence suggests that the gut microbiome may also provide predictive information for response to immune checkpoint blockade. In a multi-regional study 674 patients with resected high-risk melanoma receiving adjuvant immune checkpoint blockade, pre-treatment gut bacterial markers were associated with recurrence, with prediction performing best when patients were compared within groups matched for overall gut microbiome composition, suggesting that microbiome-based biomarkers may be informative but context dependent.

PD-1 and PD-L1 inhibitors are closely related to CTLA4 (cytotoxic T-lymphocyte-associated protein 4) inhibitors, such as ipilimumab. PD-1 and CTLA-4 are both expressed on activated T cells, but at different phases of immune response.

Current clinical trials are evaluating anti-PD-1 and PD-L1 drugs in combination with other immunotherapy drugs blocking LAG3, B7-H3, KIR, OX40, PARP, CD27, and ICOS.

== Therapeutics ==
=== PD-1 ===
Pembrolizumab (Keytruda, formerly MK-3475 and lambrolizumab) was developed by Merck and first approved by the Food and Drug Administration in 2014 for the treatment of melanoma. It was later approved for metastatic non-small cell lung cancer and head and neck squamous cell carcinoma. In 2017, it became the first immunotherapy drug approved for use based on the genetic mutations of the tumor rather than the site of the tumor. It was shown that patients with higher non-synonymous mutation burden in their tumors respond better to the treatment. Both their objective response rate and progression-free survival was shown to be higher than in patients with low non-synonymous mutation burden.

Nivolumab (Opdivo) was developed by Bristol-Myers Squibb and first approved by the FDA in 2014 for the treatment of melanoma. It was later approved for squamous cell lung cancer, renal cell carcinoma, and Hodgkin's lymphoma.

Cemiplimab (Libtayo) was developed by Regeneron Pharmaceuticals and first approved by the FDA in 2018 for the treatment of cutaneous squamous cell carcinoma (CSCC) or locally advanced CSCC who are not candidates for curative surgery or curative radiation.

Dostarlimab (Jemperli) – was developed by GlaxoSmithKline and was first approved for the treatment of mismatch repair deficient (dMMR) recurrent or advanced endometrial cancer by the FDA in April of 2021. On August 17, 2021, the FDA granted accelerated approval for the treatment of mismatch repair deficient (dMMR) recurrent or advanced solid tumors.

Retifanlimab (Zynyz) was developed by Incyte and first granted accelerated approval by the FDA in March 2023 for the treatment of Merkel cell carcinoma (MCC).

Toripalimab (Loqtorzi) is a humanized IgG4 monoclonal antibody against PD-1 approved in China in 2018 and in the United States in 2023.

Tislelizumab (Tevimbra) is a humanized IgG4 anti–PD-1 monoclonal antibody approved in China in 2019 and in the United States in 2024 for certain gastrointestinal cancers.

Serplulimab (Hetronifly, HANSIZHUANG, HLX10) is a novel anti-PD-1 monoclonal antibody approved for medical use in China in 2022. It has been approved by the National Medical Products Administration (NMPA) for the treatment of squamous non-small cell lung cancer (sqNSCLC), extensive-stage small cell lung cancer (ES-SCLC), esophageal squamous cell carcinoma (ESCC), non-squamous non-small cell lung cancer (nsqNSCLC) and gastric cancer (GC), making it the world’s first anti-PD-1 mAb for the first-line treatment of SCLC and for the treatment of perioperative gastric cancer.

==== Experimental ====
Currently, many PD-1 inhibitors are under development:

- Vopratelimab (JTX-4014) by Jounce Therapeutics As of 2020 entered Phase I trial
- Spartalizumab (PDR001) is a PD-1 inhibitor developed by Novartis to treat both solid tumors and lymphomas, which as of 2018 has entered Phase III trials.
- Camrelizumab (SHR1210) is an anti-PD-1 monoclonal antibody introduced by Jiangsu HengRui Medicine Co., Ltd. that recently received conditional approval in China for the treatment of relapsed or refractory classical Hodgkin lymphoma.
- Sintilimab (IBI308), a human anti-PD-1 antibody developed by Innovent Biologics and Eli Lilly for patients with non-small cell lung cancer (NSCLC).
- INCMGA00012 (MGA012) is a humanized IgG4 monoclonal antibody developed by Incyte and MacroGenics.
- AMP-224 by AstraZeneca/MedImmune and GlaxoSmithKline
- AMP-514 (MEDI0680) by AstraZeneca
- Acrixolimab (YBL-006) by Y-Biologics
- Sasanlimab by Pfizer

=== PD-L1 ===
Atezolizumab (Tecentriq) is a fully humanised IgG1 (immunoglobulin 1) antibody developed by Roche Genentech. In 2016, the FDA approved atezolizumab for urothelial carcinoma and non-small cell lung cancer.

Avelumab (Bavencio) is a fully human IgG1 antibody developed by Merck Serono and Pfizer. Avelumab is FDA approved for the treatment of metastatic merkel-cell carcinoma. It failed phase III clinical trials for gastric cancer.

Durvalumab (Imfinzi) is a fully human IgG1 antibody developed by AstraZeneca. Durvalumab is FDA approved for the treatment of urothelial carcinoma and unresectable non-small cell lung cancer after chemoradiation.

Cosibelimab (Unloxcyt) by Checkpoint Therapeutics is a PD-L1 inhibitor developed by Dana Farber, and was approved in the United States in December 2024 for cutaneous squamous cell carcinoma.

==== Experimental ====
At least two PD-L1 inhibitors are in the experimental phase of development.

- KN035 is the only PD-L1 antibody with subcutaneous formulation currently under clinical evaluations in the US, China, and Japan
- AUNP12 is a 29-mer peptide as the first peptic PD-1/PD-L1 inhibitor developed by Aurigene and Laboratoires Pierre Fabre that is being evaluated in clinical trial, following promising in vitro results.
- CA-170, discovered by Aurigene/Curis as the PD-L1 and VISTA antagonist, was indicted as a potent small molecule inhibitor in vitro. Thus, the compound is currently under phase I clinical trial over mesothelioma patients.
- BMS-986189 is a macrocyclic peptide discovered by Bristol-Myers Squibb of which the pharmacokinetics, safety and tolerability is currently being studied on healthy subjects.
- INCB086550 is a small-molecule PD-L1 inhibitor.

== Combinational therapy ==
=== Combination with type I Interferons ===
PD-1/PD-L1 blockade therapy is not effective for all patients, as some may exhibit resistance. To overcome resistance, a strategy involving the combination of PD-1/PD-L1 inhibitors with type I interferons has emerged. The combination of PD-1/PD-L1 inhibitors and type I interferons has shown promise in preclinical and clinical studies (phases I and II). This combination therapy leads to increased infiltration and activation of T cells within tumors, the generation of memory T cells, and improved overall survival in both animal models and patients. Notably, this approach has demonstrated efficacy in melanoma and renal carcinoma patients.

== Adverse effects ==
Immunotherapies as a group have off-target effects and toxicities common to them. Some of these include interstitial pneumonitis, colitis, hepatitis, thyroiditis, skin reactions, low levels of platelets and white blood cells, inflammation of the brain or spinal cord, neuromuscular adverse events including myositis, Guillain–Barré syndrome, myasthenia gravis; myocarditis and cardiac insufficiency, acute adrenal insufficiency, and nephritis. The most common kidney related changes are acute interstitial nephritis, followed by glomerular diseases and then tubular damage. The detailed mechanism of these adverse effects are not fully elucidated; however, they are clearly different from known autoimmune diseases. Immune-mediated adverse reactions are usually attributed to generalised dysregulation of T cells or development of autoantibodies, although memory T cell responses against occult viral infections might also play a role in some patients with advanced melanoma following combined PD-1/CTLA-4 blockade.

When compared with standard chemotherapeutic agents, PD-1/PD-L1 inhibitors had a lower reported incidence of fatigue, sensory neuropathy, diarrhea, bone marrow suppression, loss of appetite, nausea, and constipation.

== See also ==
- Cancer immunotherapy – Immune checkpoints
- Intracellular checkpoints – CISH
