= INCB086550 =

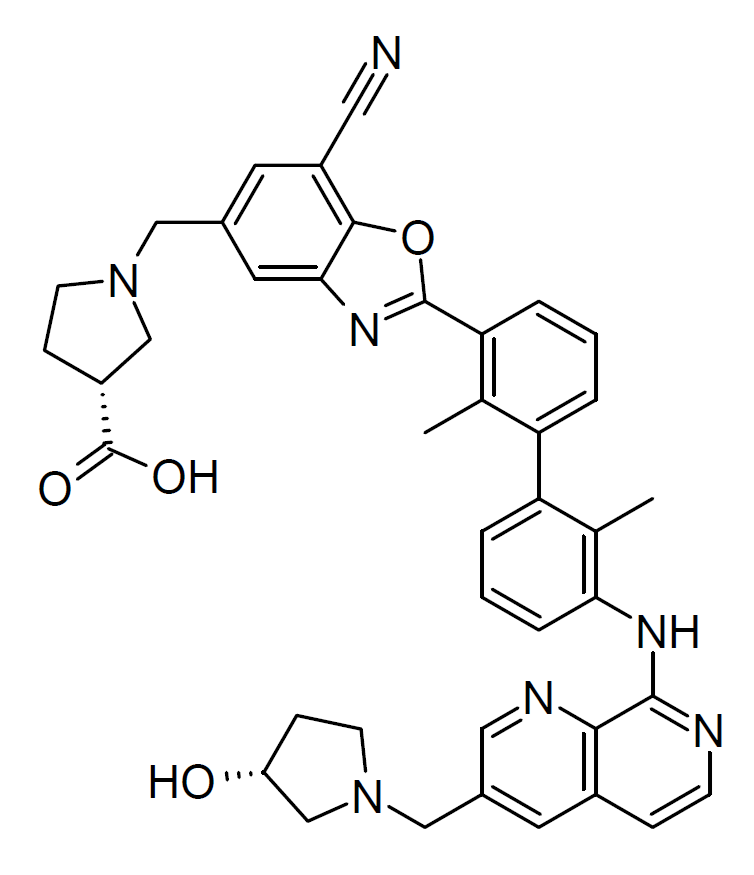

Clinical data
- Drug class: PD-L1 inhibitor

Identifiers
- IUPAC name: (3R)-1-[[7-cyano-2-[3-[3-[[3-[[(3R)-3-hydroxypyrrolidin-1-yl]methyl]-1,7-naphthyridin-8-yl]amino]-2-methylphenyl]-2-methylphenyl]-1,3-benzoxazol-5-yl]methyl]pyrrolidine-3-carboxylic acid
- CAS Number: 2230911-59-6
- PubChem CID: 135146787
- DrugBank: DB18901
- ChemSpider: 114934734
- UNII: T8B91S15VF
- ChEMBL: ChEMBL5401026

Chemical and physical data
- Formula: C_{41}H_{39}N_{7}O_{4}
- Molar mass: 693.808 g·mol^{−1}
- 3D model (JSmol): Interactive image
- SMILES: CC1=C(C=CC=C1C2=NC3=CC(=CC(=C3O2)C#N)CN4CC[C@H](C4)C(=O)O)C5=C(C(=CC=C5)NC6=NC=CC7=CC(=CN=C76)CN8CC[C@H](C8)O)C
- InChI: InChI=1S/C41H39N7O4/c1-24-32(5-3-7-34(24)40-46-36-17-26(15-30(18-42)38(36)52-40)20-47-13-10-29(22-47)41(50)51)33-6-4-8-35(25(33)2)45-39-37-28(9-12-43-39)16-27(19-44-37)21-48-14-11-31(49)23-48/h3-9,12,15-17,19,29,31,49H,10-11,13-14,20-23H2,1-2H3,(H,43,45)(H,50,51)/t29-,31-/m1/s1; Key:QARLNMDDSQMINK-BVRKHOPBSA-N

INCB086550 is a drug that is a small-molecule inhibitor of programmed death-ligand 1 (PD-L1). A number of antibodies against this target are already in clinical use for cancer treatment, but few small molecule drugs are known. INCB086550 enhances the T-lymphocyte mediated immune response against cancers which express PD-L1, and induces cytokine production. It has been researched for the treatment of cancers such as breast cancer and colorectal cancer.
