= Cemiplimab =

Pharmaceutical drug

Monoclonal antibody
- Type: Whole antibody
- Source: Human
- Target: PD-1

Clinical data
- Pronunciation: sem' ip li" mab
- Trade names: Libtayo
- Other names: REGN-2810, REGN2810, cemiplimab-rwlc
- AHFS/Drugs.com: Monograph
- MedlinePlus: a618054
- License data: US DailyMed: Cemiplimab
- Pregnancy category: AU: D
- Routes of administration: Intravenous
- ATC code: L01FF06 (WHO)

Legal status
- Legal status: AU: S4 (Prescription only); CA: ℞-only / Schedule D; US: ℞-only; EU: Rx-only; In general: ℞ (Prescription only)

Pharmacokinetic data
- Elimination half-life: 19 days

Identifiers
- CAS Number: 1801342-60-8
- DrugBank: DB14707
- ChemSpider: none
- UNII: 6QVL057INT
- KEGG: D11108

Chemical and physical data
- Formula: C_{6380}H_{9808}N_{1688}O_{2000}S_{44}
- Molar mass: 143569.10 g·mol^{−1}

Cemiplimab, sold under the brand name Libtayo, is a monoclonal antibody medication used for the treatment of squamous cell skin cancer. Cemiplimab belongs to a class of drugs that binds to the programmed death receptor-1 (PD-1), blocking the PD-1/PD-L1 pathway.

The most common side effects include fatigue, rash, diarrhea, musculoskeletal pain, and nausea.

It was approved for medical use in the United States in September 2018, in the European Union in June 2019. and in Australia in July 2020.

Cemiplimab is the first approval by the US Food and Drug Administration of a medication specifically for advanced cutaneous squamous cell carcinoma. Cemiplimab is a therapeutic alternative on the World Health Organization's List of Essential Medicines.

== Medical uses ==
Cemiplimab is indicated for the treatment of cutaneous squamous cell carcinoma; basal cell carcinoma; non-small cell lung cancer; and cervical cancer.

== Adverse effects ==
The US prescribing information includes warnings and precautions for immune-mediated adverse reactions, infusion-related reactions, complications of allogeneic hematopoietic stem cell transplantation, and embryo-fetal toxicity.

Cemiplimab is associated with side effects related to the activity of the immune system, which can be serious, although most side effects go away with appropriate treatment or on stopping cemiplimab. The most common immune-related effects (which may affect up to 1 in 10 people) were hypothyroidism (an underactive thyroid gland with tiredness, weight gain, and skin and hair changes), pneumonitis (inflammation in the lungs causing shortness of breath and cough), skin reactions, hyperthyroidism (an overactive thyroid gland which can cause hyperactivity, sweating, weight loss and thirst) and hepatitis (inflammation of the liver).

Severe reactions, including Stevens–Johnson syndrome and toxic epidermal necrolysis (life-threatening reactions with flu-like symptoms and painful rash affecting the skin, mouth, eyes and genitals) have been reported with cemiplimab.

Cemiplimab can cause harm to a developing fetus; women should be advised of the potential risk to the fetus and to use effective contraception.

== Mechanism of action ==
Cemiplimab targets the cellular pathway known as PD-1 (protein found on the body's immune cells and some cancer cells) so it acts as a checkpoint inhibitor.

== History ==
The safety and efficacy of cemiplimab was studied in two open label clinical trials. A total of 108 participants (75 with metastatic disease and 33 with locally advanced disease) were included in the efficacy evaluation. The study's primary endpoint was objective response rate, or the percentage of participants who experienced partial shrinkage or complete disappearance of their tumor(s) after treatment. Results showed that 47.2 percent of all participants treated with cemiplimab had their tumors shrink or disappear. The majority of these participants had ongoing responses at the time of data analysis.

The US Food and Drug Administration (FDA) granted the application of cemiplimab breakthrough therapy and priority review designations. The FDA granted the approval of cemiplimab-rwlc to Regeneron Pharmaceuticals.

In November 2022, the FDA approved cemiplimab in combination with platinum-based chemotherapy for adults with advanced non-small cell lung cancer with no EGFR, ALK, or ROS1 aberrations.

In October 2025, the indication for cemiplimab was expanded to include the adjuvant treatment of adults with cutaneous squamous cell carcinoma at high risk of recurrence after surgery and radiation. The efficacy was evaluated in C-POST (NCT03969004), a randomized, double-blind, multi-center, placebo-controlled trial in 415 participants with cutaneous squamous cell carcinoma at high risk of recurrence after surgery and radiation. Participants were required to complete adjuvant radiation therapy within two to ten weeks of randomization. The study excluded participants with autoimmune disease requiring systemic immunosuppressant agents within five years, a history of solid organ transplant, prior allogeneic or autologous stem cell transplantation, uncontrolled HIV, hepatitis B or hepatitis C infection, or an Eastern Oncology Group performance status ≥ 2. Participants were randomized (1:1) to receive cemiplimab-rwlc or placebo.
