= Retifanlimab =

Medication

Monoclonal antibody
- Type: Whole antibody
- Source: Humanized
- Target: Programmed cell death protein 1 (PD-1)

Clinical data
- Trade names: Zynyz
- Other names: AEX-1188, INCMGA-00012, MGA-012, retifanlimab-dlwr
- AHFS/Drugs.com: Zynyz
- MedlinePlus: a623017
- License data: US DailyMed: Retifanlimab
- Routes of administration: Intravenous
- ATC code: L01FF10 (WHO)

Legal status
- Legal status: CA: ℞-only; US: ℞-only; EU: Rx-only

Identifiers
- CAS Number: 2079108-44-2
- DrugBank: DB15766
- UNII: 2Y3T5IF01Z
- KEGG: D11827

Chemical and physical data
- Formula: C_{6456}H_{9934}N_{1702}O_{2032}S_{46}
- Molar mass: 145381.13 g·mol^{−1}

Retifanlimab, sold under the brand name Zynyz, is an anti-cancer medication used for the treatment of Merkel cell carcinoma. Retifanlimab is a programmed death receptor-1 (PD-1)–blocking monoclonal antibody.

It was approved for medical use in the United States in March 2023, and in the European Union in April 2024.

== Medical uses ==
Retifanlimab is indicated for the treatment of adults with metastatic or recurrent locally advanced Merkel cell carcinoma.

In May 2025, the US Food and Drug Administration (FDA) expanded the indication for retifanlimab to include, when used with carboplatin and paclitaxel, the first-line treatment of adults with inoperable locally recurrent or metastatic squamous-cell carcinoma of the anal canal. The FDA also approved retifanlimab, as a single agent, for adults with locally recurrent or metastatic squamous-cell carcinoma of the anal canal with disease progression on or intolerance to platinum-based chemotherapy.

== Adverse effects ==
The US Food and Drug Administration (FDA) prescription label for retifanlimab includes warnings and precautions for severe and fatal immune-mediated adverse reactions, infusion-related reactions, complications of allogeneic HSCT, and embryo-fetal toxicity.

== History ==
The US Food and Drug Administration (FDA) evaluated the safety and efficacy of retifanlimab based on PODIUM-201 (NCT03599713), an open-label, multiregional, single-arm study evaluating 65 participants with metastatic or recurrent locally advanced MCC who had not received prior systemic therapy for advanced disease.

The FDA granted the application for retifanlimab priority review, fast track, and orphan drug designations.

The efficacy of retifanlimab with carboplatin and paclitaxel was evaluated in POD1UM-303/InterAACT 2 (NCT04472429), a randomized, multi-center, double-blind trial in 308 participants with chemotherapy-naïve inoperable locally recurrent or metastatic squamous-cell carcinoma of the anal canal. Participants received carboplatin AUC of 5 on day 1, and paclitaxel 80 mg/m^{2} on days 1, 8, and 15 for 6 cycles and were randomized (1:1) to receive either retifanlimab 500 mg intravenously every 4 weeks; or placebo intravenously every 4 weeks.

The efficacy of retifanlimab as a single agent was evaluated in POD1UM-202 (NCT03597295), an open-label, multi-center, single-arm trial in 94 participants with locally recurrent or metastatic SCAC with disease progression on or intolerance to platinum-based chemotherapy. Participants received retifanlimab 500 mg intravenously every 4 weeks until disease progression, unacceptable toxicity, or up to 24 months.

== Society and culture ==
=== Legal status ===
In February 2024, the Committee for Medicinal Products for Human Use of the European Medicines Agency adopted a positive opinion, recommending the granting of a marketing authorization for the medicinal product Zynyz, intended for the treatment of Merkel cell carcinoma. The applicant for this medicinal product is Incyte Biosciences Distribution B.V. Retifanlimab was authorized for medical use in the European Union in April 2024.

=== Names ===
Retifanlimab is the international nonproprietary name.

Retifanlimab is sold under the brand name Zynyz.
