= Dostarlimab =

Medication for endometrial cancer treatment

Monoclonal antibody
- Type: Whole antibody
- Source: Humanized
- Target: PD-1

Clinical data
- Trade names: Jemperli
- Other names: TSR-042, WBP-285, dostarlimab-gxly
- AHFS/Drugs.com: Monograph
- MedlinePlus: a621030
- License data: US DailyMed: Dostarlimab
- Pregnancy category: AU: D
- Routes of administration: Intravenous
- Drug class: Antineoplastic
- ATC code: L01FF07 (WHO)

Legal status
- Legal status: AU: S4 (Prescription only); CA: ℞-only / Schedule D; US: ℞-only; EU: Rx-only

Identifiers
- CAS Number: 2022215-59-2
- PubChem SID: 384585344
- DrugBank: DB15627
- UNII: P0GVQ9A4S5
- KEGG: D11366

Chemical and physical data
- Formula: C_{6420}H_{9832}N_{1690}O_{2014}S_{44}
- Molar mass: 144325.73 g·mol^{−1}

Dostarlimab, sold under the brand name Jemperli, is a monoclonal antibody used as an anti-cancer medication for the treatment of endometrial cancer and rectal cancer. Dostarlimab is a programmed death receptor-1 (PD-1)–blocking monoclonal antibody.

The most common side effects reported in the US include fatigue/asthenia, nausea, diarrhea, anemia, and constipation. Additional side effects reported in the European Union include vomiting, joint pain, itching, rash, fever, and hypothyroidism (low levels of thyroid hormones).

== History ==
In 2020, dostarlimab, a PD-1 inhibitor, was undergoing phase I/II and phase III clinical trials. That year, its manufacturer, Tesaro, announced preliminary successful results from the phase I/II GARNET study, indicating potential efficacy in patients with recurrent or advanced endometrial cancer.

In April 2021, the US Food and Drug Administration (FDA) granted accelerated approval to dostarlimab-gxly (Jemperli, GSK). Efficacy was evaluated based on cohort (A1) in Garnet Trial (NCT02715284), a multicenter, multicohort, open-label trial in participants with advanced solid tumors. The FDA approved dostarlimab based on evidence from the GARNET trial (NCT02715284) of 71 participants with advanced or recurrent endometrial cancer that was shown to be mismatch repair deficient (dMMR), and for which certain types of chemotherapy did not work or was no longer working. The cohort used for the approved indication was conducted at 40 sites in 7 countries in North America and Europe.

In 2022, an early clinical study of dostarlimab reported a 100% remission rate in 14 patients with rectal cancer who had mismatch repair deficiency, a type of genetic mutation that only affects 5-10% of cases.

In February 2023, the FDA approved dostarlimab-gxly (Jemperli, GlaxoSmithKline LLC) for adults with mismatch repair deficient (dMMR) recurrent or advanced endometrial cancer, as determined by an FDA-approved test, that has progressed on or following a prior platinum-containing regimen in any setting and are not candidates for curative surgery or radiation.

In October 2026, FDA granted accelerated approval for use in rectal cancer. In some patients, it is approved as a first-line therapy, ahead of surgery, radiation, and chemotherapy. The approval was based on the results from the Phase II AZUR-1 trial, in which 47% of evaluable patients achieved a sustained clinical complete response lasting at least 12 months.

== Medical uses ==
Dostarlimab approved to treat specific cancers in various jurisdictions.

=== Endometrial cancer ===
In endometrial cancer cancerous cells reside in the lining of the uterus (endometrium). The four stages in endometrial cancer range from settling in the endometrium to metastasizing to other organs. This disease can be treated if discovered early enough. Studies report that chemoresistant MSI-high tumors can be treated with dostarlimab and pembrolizumab.

In the European Union, dostarlimab is indicated as monotherapy for the treatment of adults with mismatch repair deficient (dMMR)/microsatellite instability-high (MSI H) recurrent or advanced endometrial cancer that has progressed on or following prior treatment with a platinum-based regimen such as cisplatin, carboplatin or oxaliplatin.

Dostarlimab is approved in the US for adults with dMMR recurrent or advanced solid tumors that have progressed on or following prior treatment and who lack satisfactory alternative treatment options. Dostarlimab, in combination with carboplatin and paclitaxel, followed by single-agent dostarlimab, is approved for primary advanced or recurrent dMMR endometrial cancer. Efficacy was evaluated in RUBY (NCT03981796), a randomized, multicenter, double-blind, placebo-controlled trial. Efficacy was assessed in a pre-specified subgroup of 122 participants with dMMR/MSI-H primary advanced or recurrent endometrial cancer. MMR/MSI tumor status was assessed by local testing assays (IHC, PCR, or NGS), or central testing (IHC), using the Ventana MMR RxDx Panel, when local results were unavailable. In August 2024, the Food and Drug Administration approved dostarlimab with carboplatin and paclitaxel, followed by single-agent dostarlimab, for adults with primary advanced or recurrent endometrial cancer. Dostarlimab previously was approved with carboplatin and paclitaxel, followed by single-agent dostarlimab, for primary advanced or recurrent endometrial cancer that is mismatch repair deficient (dMMR) or microsatellite instability-high (MSI-H).

=== Solid tumors ===
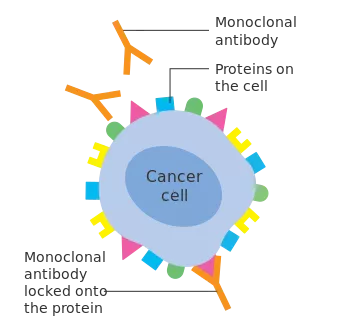
Diagram showing a monoclonal antibody attached to a cancer cell CRUK 070 from Cancer Research UK.

Solid tumors are tumors that do not contain any liquid or cysts, which can occur in many places including bones, muscles and organs. The most common types of solid tumors are sarcomas and carcinomas. Dostarlimab can be used to treat recurrent or advanced tumors for patients who have tried alternative treatment options.

=== Colorectal cancer ===
Dostarlimab-gxly is approved as first-line treatment for dMMR cancers that comprise 5–10% of colorectal cancers. Treatment completely eradicated tumors in all 42 patients in a Phase II trial. Traditional surgery patients often experience life-long impacts, such as bowel, urinary and sexual dysfunction, as well as secondary cancers and infertility.

== Side effects ==
Serious adverse reactions in >2% of patients included sepsis, acute kidney injury, urinary tract infection, abdominal pain, and fever (pyrexia).

Immune-mediated adverse reactions can occur including pneumonitis, colitis, hepatitis, endocrine disease (endocrinopathies), and nephritis.

The most common side effects reported while taking this medication during a trial were dyspnea, asthenia, fatigue, and nausea.

Symptoms of overdose are similar to the side effect profile of the medication, so it could involve significant immune-mediated reactions.

=== Immune-mediated adverse reactions ===
Dostarlimab is a monoclonal antibody that binds to PD-1 to block it from binding PD-1 ligands to remove inhibition of immune response. With this, it causes risk for immune-mediated adverse reactions. These reactions can be severe or fatal and occur in any part of the body: organs or tissues.

Examples of immune-mediated adverse reactions include immune-mediated pneumonitis, colitis, hepatitis, adrenal insufficiency, hypophysitis, thyroid disorders, nephritis with renal dysfunction, and dermatologic reactions.

=== Pregnancy and lactation ===
Dostarlimab can cause harm to a fetus. The death of the fetus can occur from the immune system's reaction to the fetus through the examination of its mechanism in animal studies. Dostarlimab is a human immunoglobulin G (IgG4), which could permeate through the placental barrier. This may risk harm to the developing fetus as the drug may be passed on from the mother.

Data is not available regarding the presence of dostarlimab in breastmilk.

=== Hepatotoxicity ===
Dostarlimab causes mild to moderate elevations to serum aminotransferase and alkaline phosphatase in 15-25% of recipients. Serum ALT elevation above five times the normal range occurs in 2-3% of recipients. Some people treated with dostarlimab can develop immune related liver injury.

Some symptoms of liver injury or acute liver failure can include jaundice, pain in the upper right abdomen, ascites, nausea/vomiting, and disorientation or confusion.

== Pharmacology ==
Dostarlimab is a humanized IgG4 monoclonal antibody that was derived from a mouse antibody which was humanized via Complementarity Determining Region (CDR) grafting. Its serum half-life is 25.4 days.

Other PD-1 antibodies included nivolumab (Opdivo) and pembrolizumab (Keytruda), both of which have uses in many different types of cancers which include classical Hodgkin lymphoma, renal cell carcinoma, and breast cancer. Another PD-1 antibody is cemiplimab (Libtayo) which was approved for treatment of squamous cell carcinoma, basal cell carcinoma and non-small cell lung cancer.

=== Mechanism of action ===
Dostarlimab binds to the PD-1 receptor, with high affinity, to block its activity with PD-1 ligands (PD-L1 and PD-L2). PD-1 is a co-inhibitory receptor that is an important checkpoint protein for regulating T-cell tolerance. When PD-1 is constantly stimulated by PD-1 ligands, which are highly expressed in cancer cells, it allows cancer cells to dodge T-cell mediated immune responses. Therefore, blocking the binding of PD-1 to these ligands can allow T-cells to function normally and prevent tumor cells from bypassing immune surveillance. In mouse tumor models, it was shown that inhibiting PD-1 activity decreased tumor growth.

=== Efficacy ===
In the Garnet Trial, dostarlimab achieved favorable results in decreasing the size of the tumor in those with endometrial cancer. The study observed people with endometrial cancer from seven different countries and the size of the tumor was reduced in 42% of the population studied.

Dostarlimab exhibits better efficacy than PD-L1 inhibitors, such as avelumab and durvalumab, in dMMR advanced endometrial cancers. Efficacy of the drug is measured by the response rate, which is 47% for dostarlimab.

== Society and culture ==
Dostarlimab is the international nonproprietary name (INN), and the United States Adopted Name (USAN).

=== Legal status ===
In February 2021, the Committee for Medicinal Products for Human Use (CHMP) of the European Medicines Agency (EMA) adopted a positive opinion, recommending the granting of a conditional marketing authorization for the medicinal product Jemperli, intended for the treatment of certain types of recurrent or advanced endometrial cancer. The applicant for this medicinal product is GSK (Ireland) Limited. Dostarlimab was approved for medical use in the European Union in April 2021.

=== Economics ===
In the United States in early 2025, dostarlimab costs a little over US$12,000 per dose.

Among those who are insured, those who have Medicaid insurance are less likely to receive full care for gynecologic cancer. Those insured through private insurance still experience economical hardships while getting treatment. Uninsured patients do not tend to get screened regularly, which results in late diagnosis of the disease.
