= Cosibelimab =

Medication

Monoclonal antibody
- Type: Whole antibody
- Source: Human
- Target: PD-L1

Clinical data
- Trade names: Unloxcyt
- Other names: CK-301, TG-1501, cosibelimab-ipdl
- License data: US DailyMed: Cosibelimab
- Drug class: Antineoplastic
- ATC code: None

Legal status
- Legal status: US: ℞-only

Identifiers
- CAS Number: 2216751-26-5
- DrugBank: DB15770
- UNII: PNW7GBB44P
- KEGG: D11946

Chemical and physical data
- Formula: C_{6388}H_{9912}N_{1716}O_{2032}S_{44}
- Molar mass: 144674.18 g·mol^{−1}

Cosibelimab, sold under the brand name Unloxcyt, is a monoclonal antibody used for the treatment of cutaneous squamous-cell carcinoma. It is a human immunoglobulin G1 (IgG1) programmed death ligand-1 (PD-L1) blocking antibody.

The most common adverse reactions include fatigue, musculoskeletal pain, rash, diarrhea, hypothyroidism, constipation, nausea, headache, pruritis, edema, localized infection, and urinary tract infection.

Cosibelimab was approved for medical use in the United States in December 2024.

== Medical uses ==
Cosibelimab is indicated for the treatment of adults with metastatic cutaneous squamous-cell carcinoma or locally advanced cutaneous squamous-cell carcinoma who are not candidates for curative surgery or curative radiation.

== History ==
Efficacy was evaluated in study CK-301-101 (NCT03212404), a multicenter, multicohort, open-label trial in 109 participants with metastatic cutaneous squamous-cell carcinoma or locally advanced cutaneous squamous-cell carcinoma who were not candidates for curative surgery or curative radiation. Participants were excluded if they had any of the following: active or suspected autoimmune disease, allogeneic transplant within six months prior to treatment, prior treatment with anti-PD-1/PD-L1 blocking antibodies or other immune checkpoint inhibitor therapy, uncontrolled or significant cardiovascular disease, ECOG PS • 2, or infection with HIV, hepatitis B, or hepatitis C.

== Society and culture ==
=== Legal status ===
Cosibelimab was approved for medical use in the United States in December 2024.

=== Names ===
Cosibelimab is the international nonproprietary name.

Cosibelimab is sold under the brand name Unloxcyt.
