= Cutaneous squamous-cell carcinoma =

- Other names: Squamous-cell carcinoma of the skin, squamous-cell skin cancer, epidermoid carcinoma, squamous-cell epithelioma of the skin
- Cutaneous squamous-cell carcinoma tends to arise from actinic keratoses (premalignant lesions); surface is usually scaly and often ulcerates (as shown here).
- Specialty: Dermatology, plastic surgery, otorhinolaryngology
- Symptoms: Hard lump with a scaly top or ulceration.
- Risk factors: Ultraviolet radiation, actinic keratosis, tobacco smoking, lighter skin, arsenic exposure, radiotherapy, poor immune system function, HPV infection
- Diagnostic method: Tissue biopsy
- Differential diagnosis: Keratoacanthoma, actinic keratosis, melanoma, warts, basal cell cancer
- Prevention: Decreased UV radiation exposure, quitting smoking, sunscreen
- Treatment: Surgical removal, radiotherapy, chemotherapy, immunotherapy
- Prognosis: Usually good
- Frequency: 2.2 million (2015)
- Deaths: 51,900 (2015)

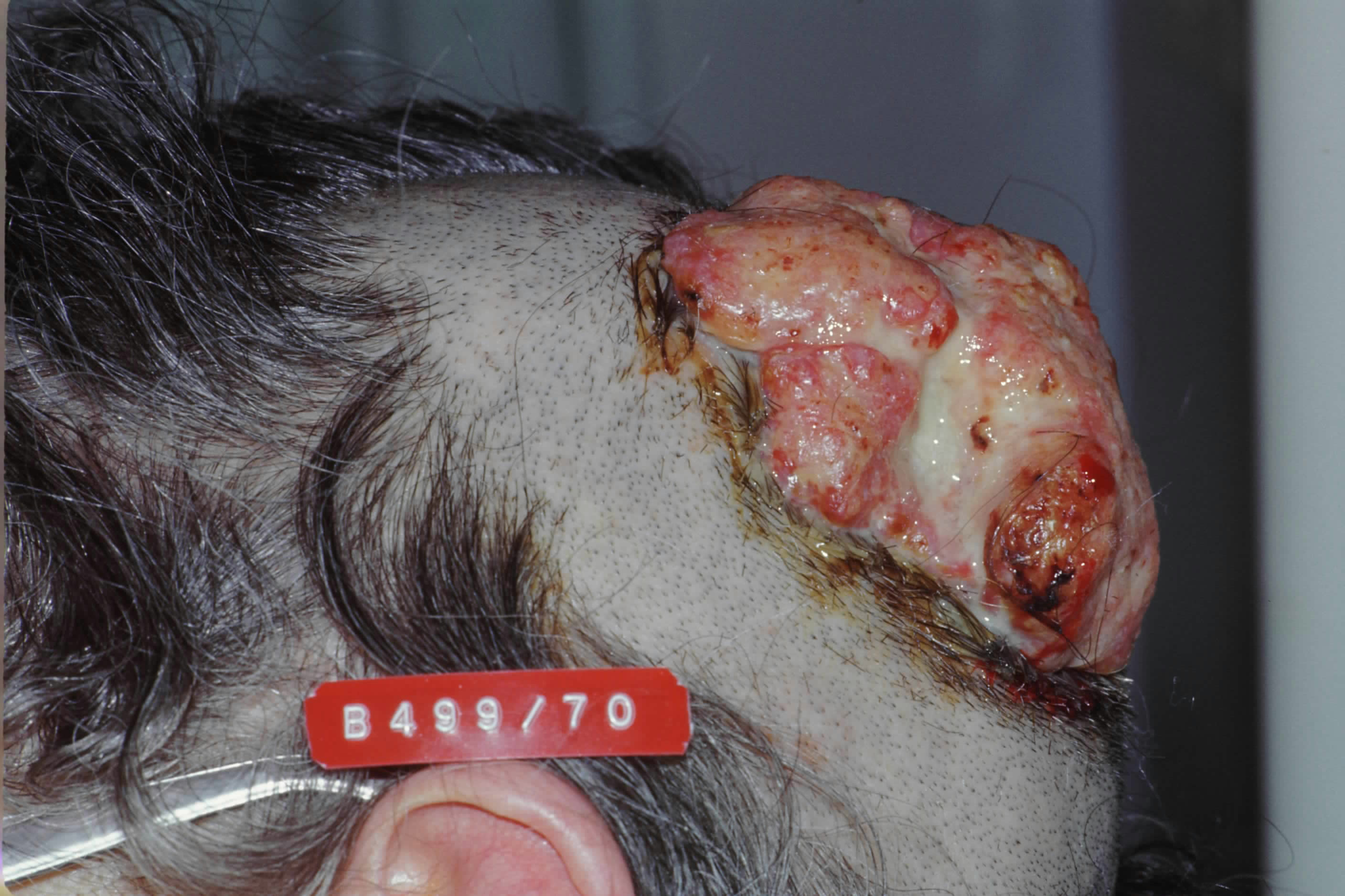
neglected squamous cell carcinoma skin of scalp

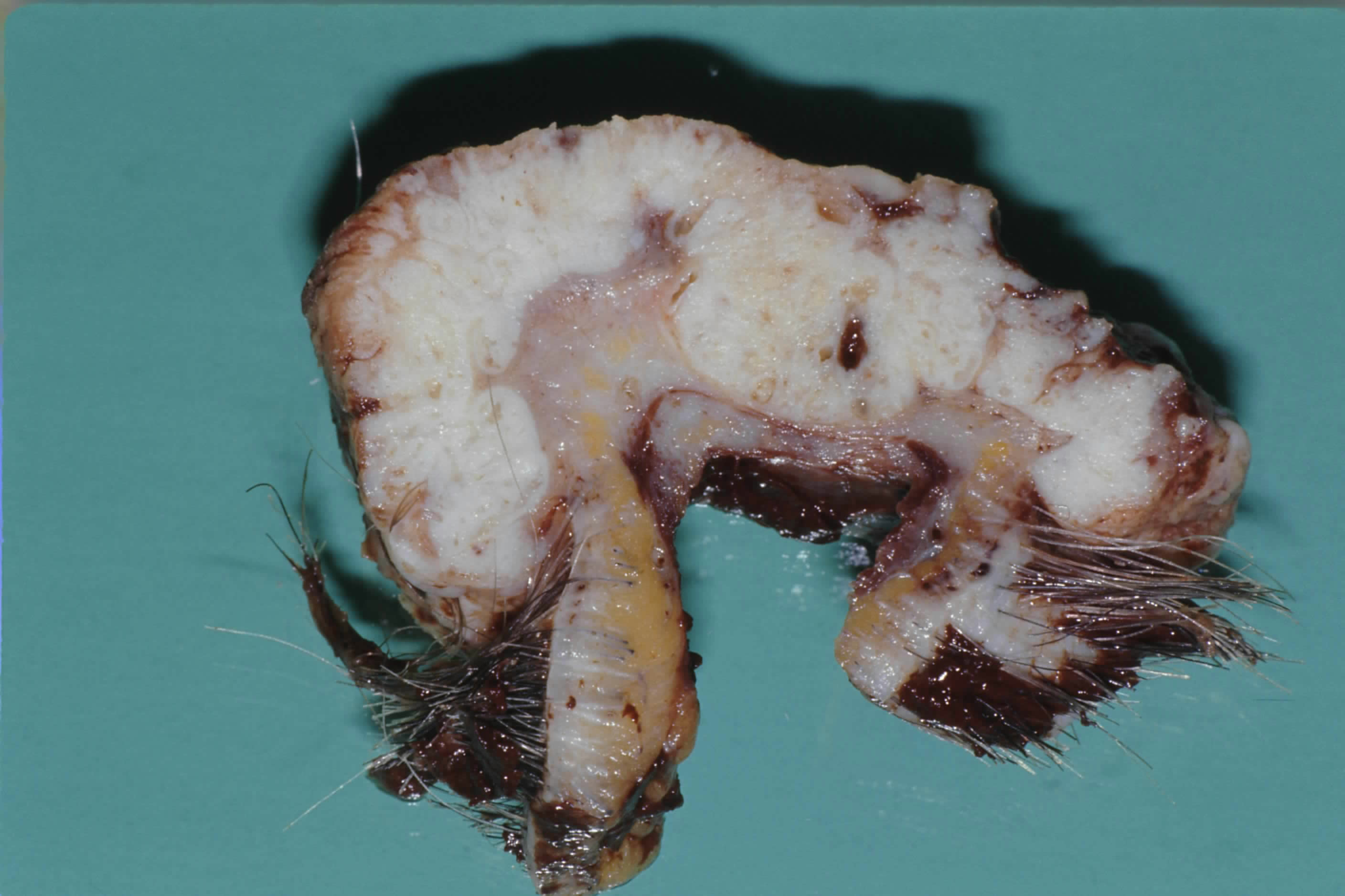
Advanced squamous cell carcinoma, excision specimen. Note invasion subcutaneous tissue.

Cutaneous squamous-cell carcinoma (cSCC), also known as squamous-cell carcinoma of the skin or squamous-cell skin cancer, is one of the three principal types of skin cancer, alongside basal-cell carcinoma and melanoma. cSCC typically presents as a hard lump with a scaly surface, though it may also present as an ulcer. Onset and development often occurs over several months.

Compared to basal cell carcinoma, cSCC is more likely to spread to distant areas. When confined to the epidermis, the outermost layer of the skin, the pre-invasive or in situ form of cSCC is termed Bowen's disease.

The most significant risk factor for cSCC is extensive lifetime exposure to ultraviolet radiation from sunlight. Additional risk factors include age, poor immune system function, prior scars, chronic wounds, actinic keratosis, lighter skin susceptible to sunburn, Bowen's disease, exposure to arsenic, radiation therapy, tobacco smoking, previous basal cell carcinoma, and HPV infection. The risk associated with UV radiation correlates with cumulative exposure rather than early-life exposure. Tanning beds have emerged as a significant source of UV radiation and risk factor for cSCC.

Genetic predispositions, such as xeroderma pigmentosum and certain forms of epidermolysis bullosa, also increase susceptibility to cSCC. The condition originates from squamous cells located in the skin's upper layers. Diagnosis typically relies on skin examination and is confirmed through skin biopsy.

Research, both in vivo and in vitro, indicates a crucial role for the upregulation of FGFR2, part of the fibroblast growth factor receptor immunoglobin family, in cSCC cell progression. Mutations in the TPL2 gene leads to overexpression of FGFR2, which activates the mTORC1 and AKT pathways in primary and metastatic cSCC cell lines. Utilization of a "pan FGFR inhibitor" has been shown to reduce cell migration and proliferation in cSCC in vitro studies.

Preventive measures against cSCC include minimizing exposure to ultraviolet radiation and the use of sunscreen. Surgical removal is the typical treatment method, employing simple excision for minor cases or Mohs surgery for more extensive instances. Other options include cryotherapy and radiation therapy. For cases with distant metastasis, chemotherapy or biologic therapy may be employed.

As of 2015, approximately 2.2 million individuals globally were living with cSCC at any given time, constituting about 20% of all skin cancer cases. In the United States, approximately 12% of males and 7% of females are diagnosed with cSCC at some point in their lives. The risk of nodal metastasis (spread to lymph nodes) is 1.9-5.2%, and the overall mortality is 1.5-3.4%. While prognosis remains favorable in the absence of metastasis, upon distant spread the five-year survival rate is markedly reduced to ~34%. In 2015, global deaths attributed to cSCC numbered around 52,000. The average age at diagnosis is approximately 66 years. Following successful treatment of an initial cSCC lesion, there is a substantial risk of developing subsequent lesions.

== Signs and symptoms ==
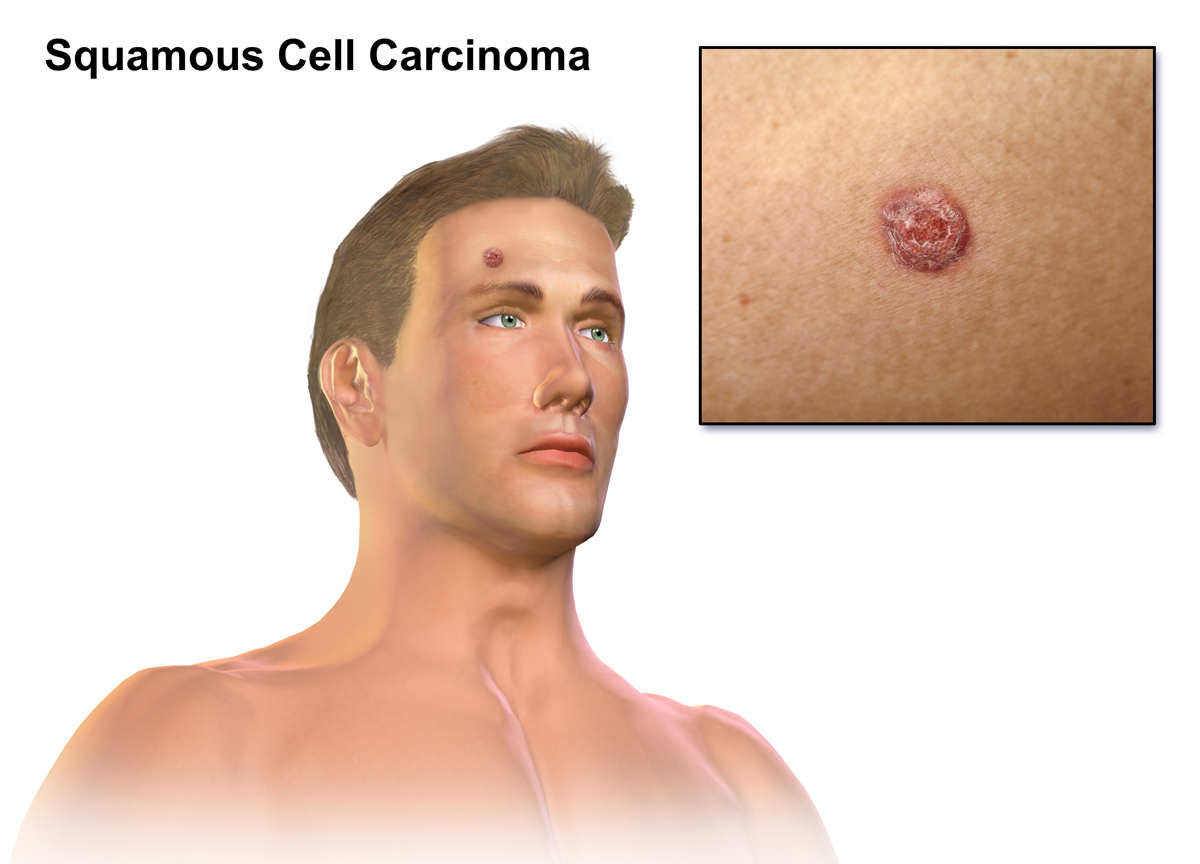
Cutaneous squamous-cell carcinoma

SCC of the skin begins as a small nodule, and as it enlarges, the center becomes necrotic and sloughs, and the nodule turns into an ulcer, generally developing from an actinic keratosis. Once keratinocytes begin to grow uncontrollably, they have the potential to become cancerous and produce cutaneous squamous-cell carcinoma.

- The lesion caused by cSCC is often asymptomatic
- Ulcer or reddish skin plaque that is slow-growing
- Intermittent bleeding from the tumor, especially on the lip
- The clinical appearance is highly variable
- Usually the tumor presents as an ulcerated lesion with hard, raised edges
- The tumor may be in the form of a hard plaque or a papule, often with an opalescent quality, with tiny blood vessels
- The tumor can lie below the level of the surrounding skin, and eventually ulcerates and invades the underlying tissue
- The tumor commonly presents on sun-exposed areas (e.g., back of the hand, scalp, lip, and superior surface of pinna)
- On the lip, the tumor forms a small ulcer, which fails to heal and bleeds intermittently
- Evidence of chronic skin photodamage, as in multiple actinic keratoses (solar keratoses)
- The tumor grows relatively slowly

=== Spread ===
- Unlike basal-cell carcinoma (BCC), squamous-cell carcinoma (SCC) has a higher risk of metastasis.
- Risk of metastasis is higher clinically in SCC arising in scars, on the lower lips, ears, or mucosa, and occurring in immunosuppressed and solid organ transplant patients. Risk of metastasis is also higher in SCC that are > 2 cm in diameter, growth into the fat layer and along nerves, presence of lymphovascular invasion, poorly differentiated cell architecture on histology, or thickness greater than 6 mm.

== Causes ==
Cutaneous squamous-cell carcinoma is the second-most common cancer of the skin (after basal-cell carcinoma, but more common than melanoma). It usually occurs in areas exposed to the sun with the majority of cSCC cases being located on exposed skin and often the result of ultraviolet exposure. cSCC represents about 20% of the non-melanoma skin cancers; 80-90% of cSCCs with metastatic potential are located on the head and neck. Squamous-cell cancers of the lip and ears also have high rates of local recurrence and distant metastasis. Sunlight exposure and immunosuppression are risk factors for SCC of the skin, with chronic sun exposure being the strongest environmental risk factor.

Age is also an important risk factor in the development of SCC of the skin. The risk of SCC is 5 to 10 times higher in those older than 75 as compared to those younger than 55 years old. Those with fairer skin types (who tend to sunburn more easily) are also at increased risk of SCC.

The deletion or severe down-regulation of the Tpl2 (tumor progression locus 2) gene may be involved in the progression of normal keratinocytes into becoming squamous-cell carcinoma.

Tobacco smoking also increases the risk for cutaneous squamous-cell carcinoma.

SCC in situ of the glans or prepuce in males, or the vulva in females. may be induced by human papilloma virus. It is reported to occur in the corneoscleral limbus. SCC may also occur on the anal mucosa or the oral mucosa.

Genetically, cSCC tumors harbor high frequencies of NOTCH and p53 mutations as well as less frequent alterations in histone acetyltransferase EP300, subunit of the SWI/SNF chromatin remodeling complex PBRM1, DNA-repair deubiquitinase USP28, and NF-κB signaling regulator CHUK.

A significant proportion of cSCC and its precursor lesions carry UV-induced p53 mutations. These mutations are present in up to 90% of cSCC cases. The detection of p53 mutations in precursor lesions indicates that this could be an early event in the development of squamous cell carcinoma.

Rare genetic disorders such as albinism and xeroderma pigmentosum increase the risk of SCC, typically with an earlier disease onset. Those with a family history of SCC are at two to four times increased risk of developing the disease themselves.

=== Immunosuppression ===
Immunosuppression is an important risk factor in the development of cSCC, with the risk of developing cSCC being 5-113 times higher in those who are immunosuppressed. People who have received solid organ transplants are at a significantly increased risk of developing cSCC due to the use of chronic immunosuppressive medication. While the risk of developing all skin cancers increases with these medications, this effect is particularly severe for cSCC, with hazard ratios as high as 250 being reported, versus 40 for basal cell carcinoma. The incidence of cSCC development increases with time posttransplant. Heart and lung transplant recipients are at the highest risk of developing cSCC due to more intensive immunosuppressive medications used.

Cutaneous squamous-cell carcinoma in individuals on immunotherapy or who have lymphoproliferative disorders (e.g., leukemia) tends to be much more aggressive, regardless of their location. The risk of cSCC, and non-melanoma skin cancers generally, varies with the immunosuppressive drug regimen chosen. The risk is greatest with calcineurin inhibitors like cyclosporine and tacrolimus, and least with mTOR inhibitors, such as sirolimus and everolimus. The antimetabolites azathioprine and mycophenolic acid have an intermediate risk profile.

== Diagnosis ==
Diagnosis is confirmed via skin biopsy of the tissue or tissues suspected to be affected by SCC. The pathological appearance of a squamous-cell cancer varies with the depth of the biopsy. For that reason, a biopsy including the subcutaneous tissue and basilar epithelium to the surface is necessary for correct diagnosis. The performance of a shave biopsy (see skin biopsy) might not acquire enough information for a diagnosis. An inadequate biopsy might be read as actinic keratosis with follicular involvement. A deeper biopsy down to the dermis or subcutaneous tissue might reveal the true cancer. An excision biopsy is ideal, but not practical in most cases. An incisional or punch biopsy is preferred. A shave biopsy is least ideal, especially if only the superficial portion is acquired.

=== Histological characteristics ===
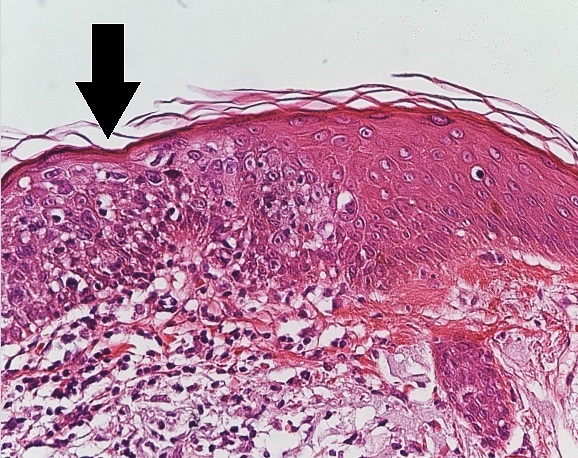
Histopathology of squamous-cell carcinoma in situ (black arrow), compared to normal skin, showing marked atypia.

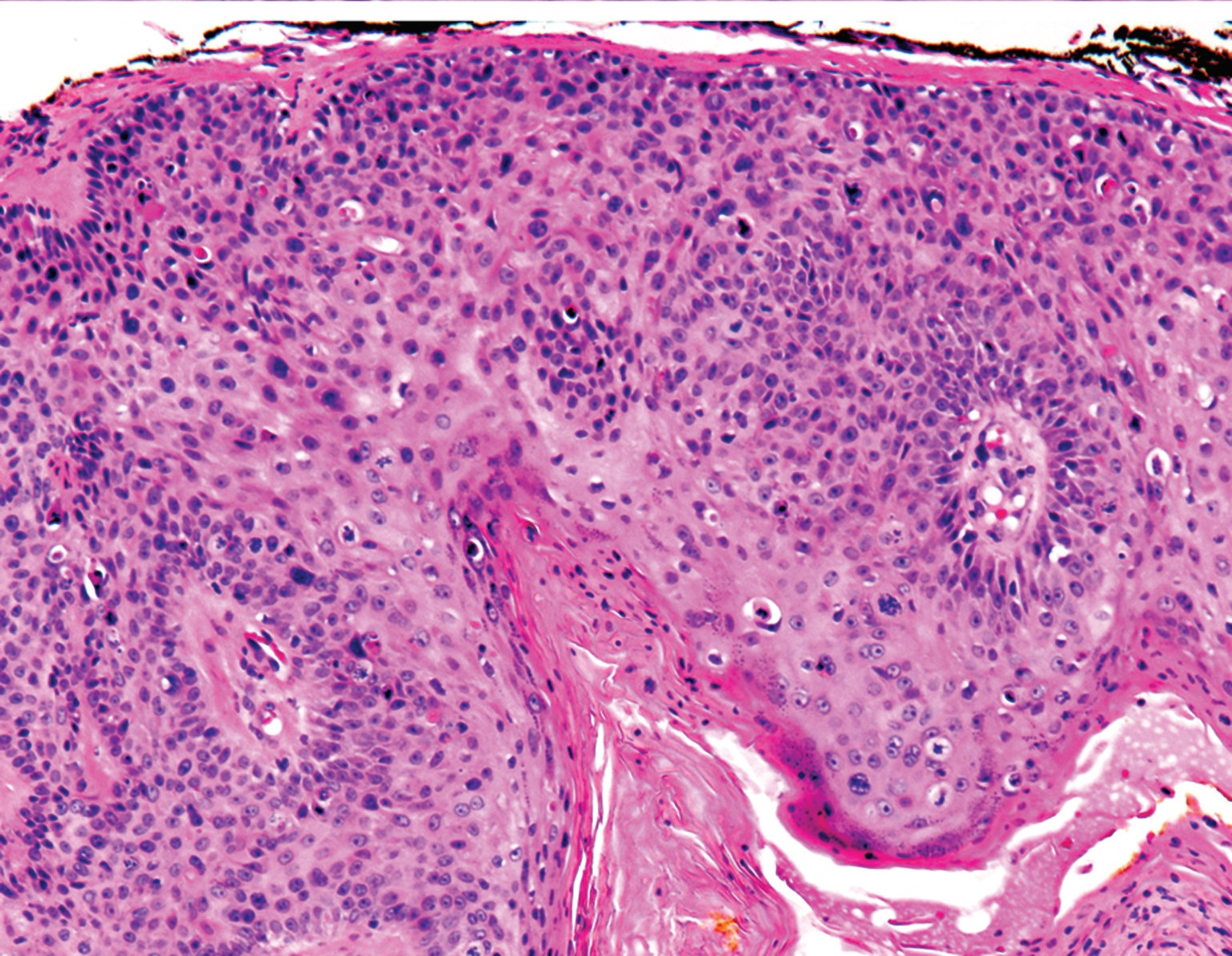
Squamous-cell carcinoma in situ, showing prominent dyskeratosis and aberrant mitoses at all levels of the epidermis, along with marked parakeratosis.

=== In situ disease ===
Bowen's disease (also known as cSCC in situ) is SCC that has not invaded through the basement membrane and is localized to the top layer of skin (the epidermis). The risk of progression of SCC in situ to cSCC is 3-5%, and if progression does occur, the risk of metastasis is 20%. The skin cells are often highly atypical under the microscope, and may look more unusual than the cells of some invasive squamous-cell carcinomas.

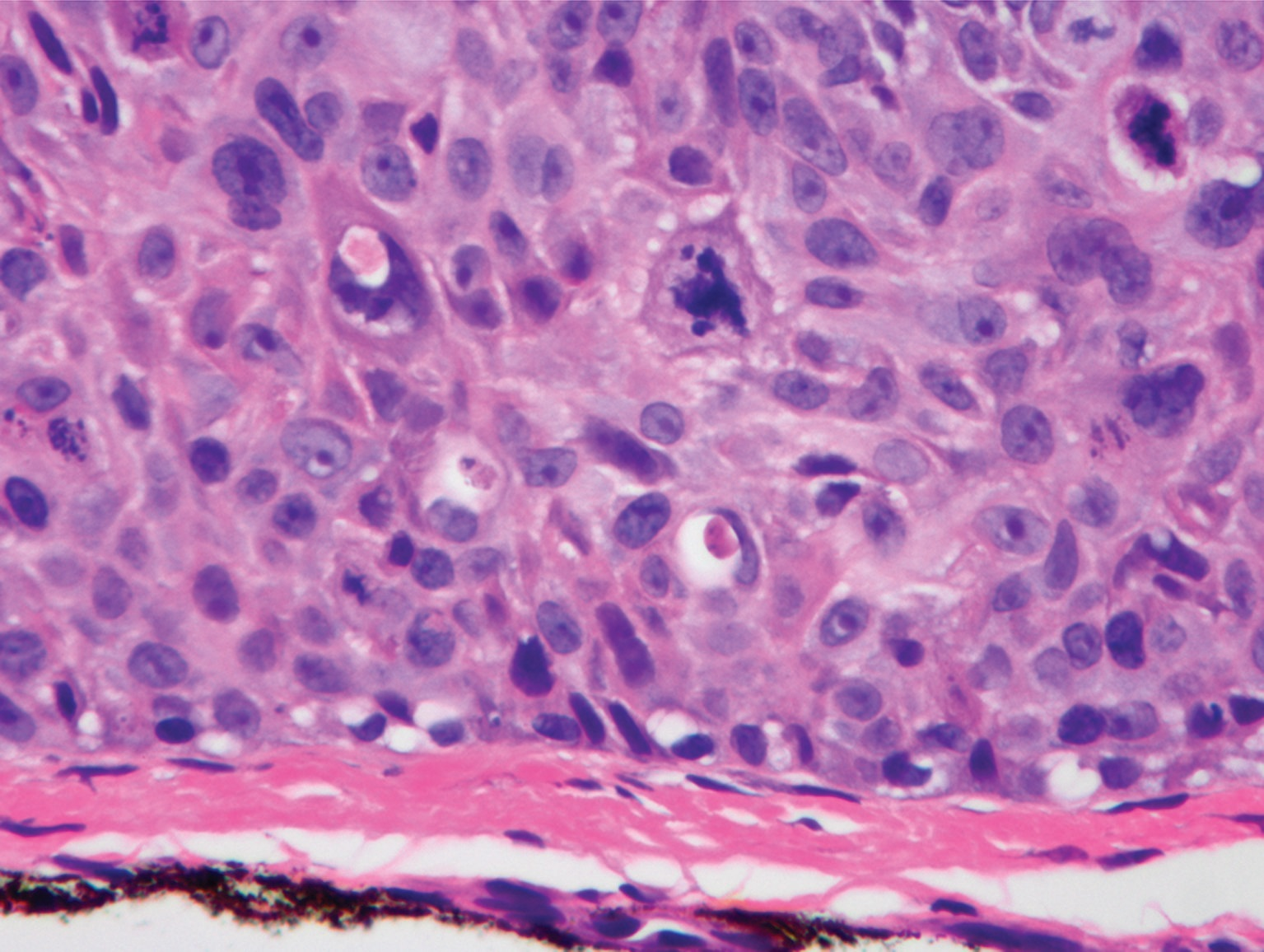
cSCC in situ, high magnification, demonstrating an intact basement membrane.

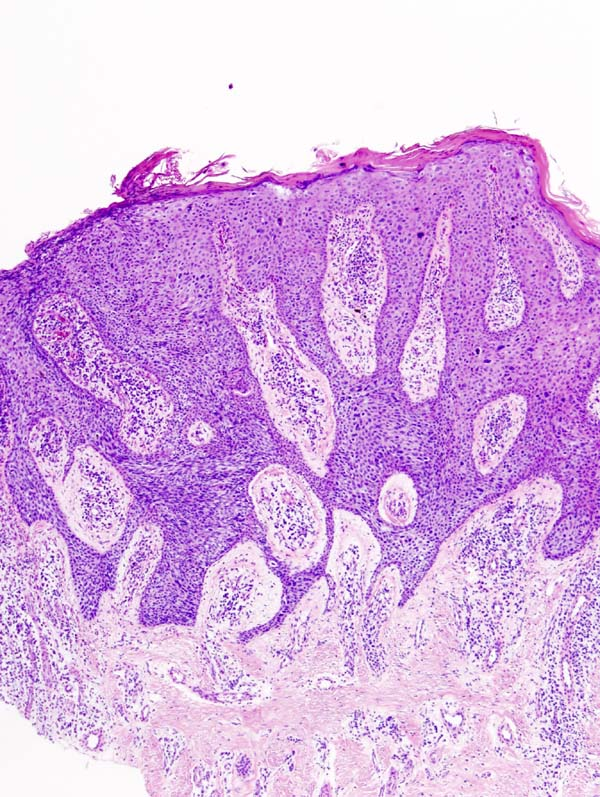
cSCC in situ

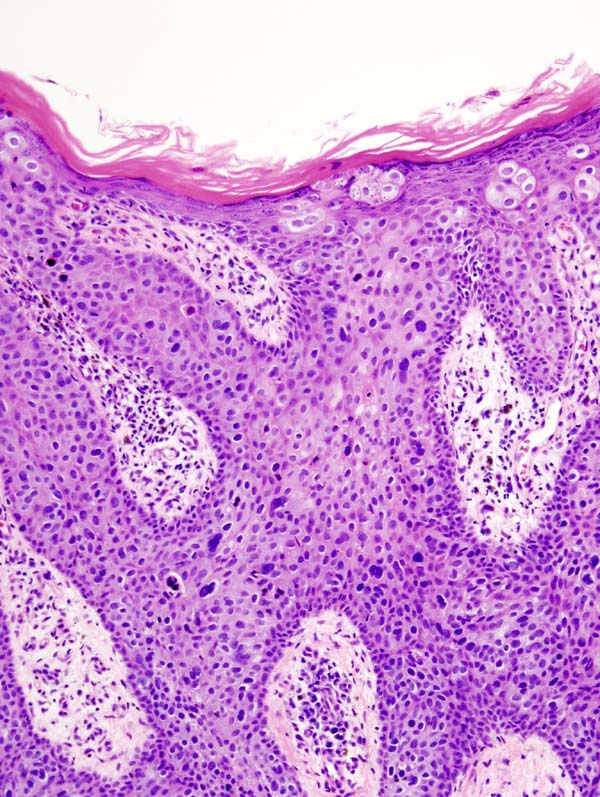
cSCC in situ

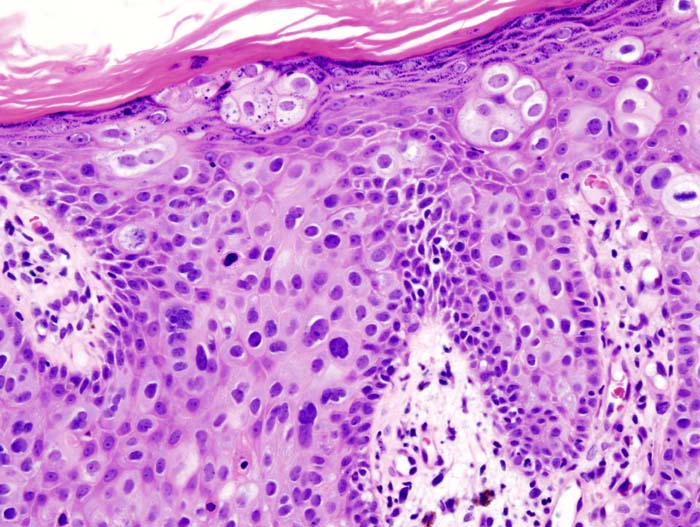
cSCC in situ

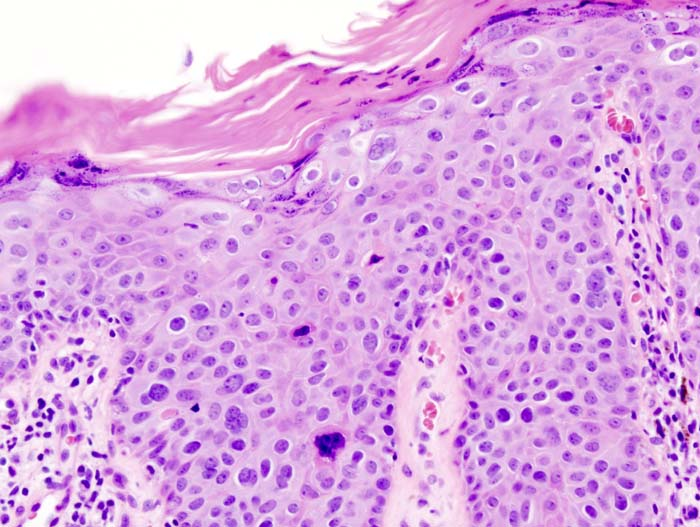
cSCC in situ

Erythroplasia of Queyrat is a particular type of Bowen's disease that can arise on the glans or prepuce in males, and the vulva in females. It mainly occurs in uncircumcised males, over the age of 40.

=== Invasive disease ===
In invasive cSCC, tumor cells infiltrate through the basement membrane and may involve hair follicles, or form nests of atypical, cancerous cells in the dermal layer. Invasive SCC may also involve a corresponding inflammatory infiltrate.

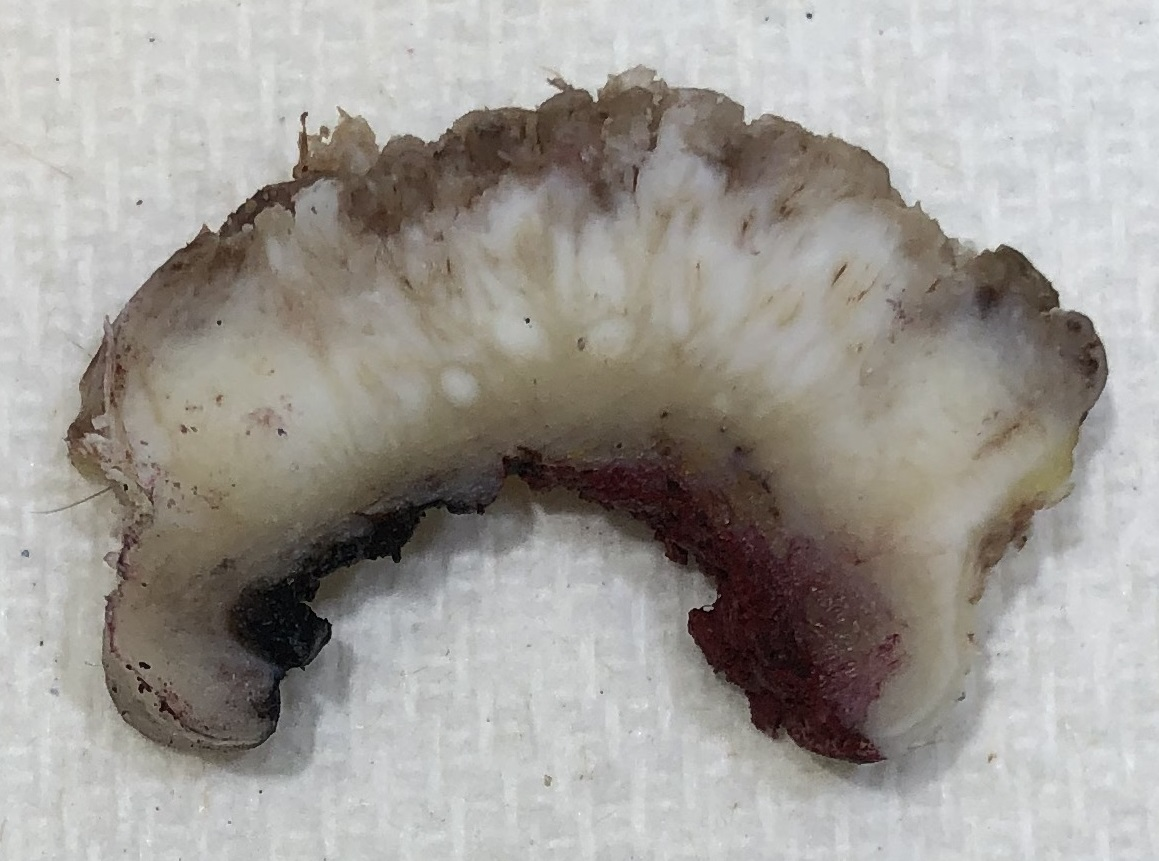
Gross slice of squamous-cell carcinoma of the skin

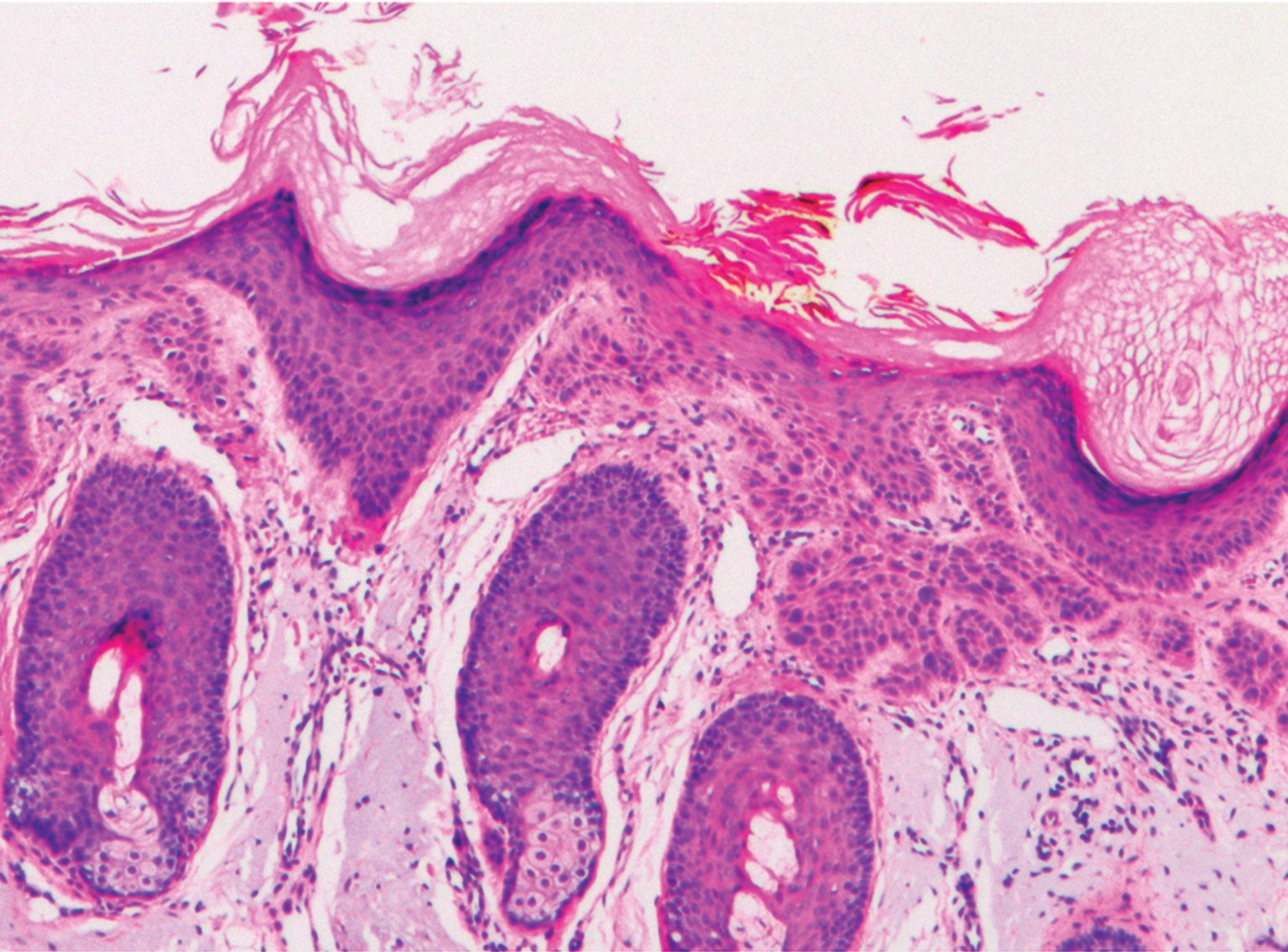
Superficially invasive cutaneous squamous-cell carcinoma. These lesions often do not show the marked pleomorphism and atypical nuclei of cSCC in situ, but manifest early keratinocyte invasion of the dermis.

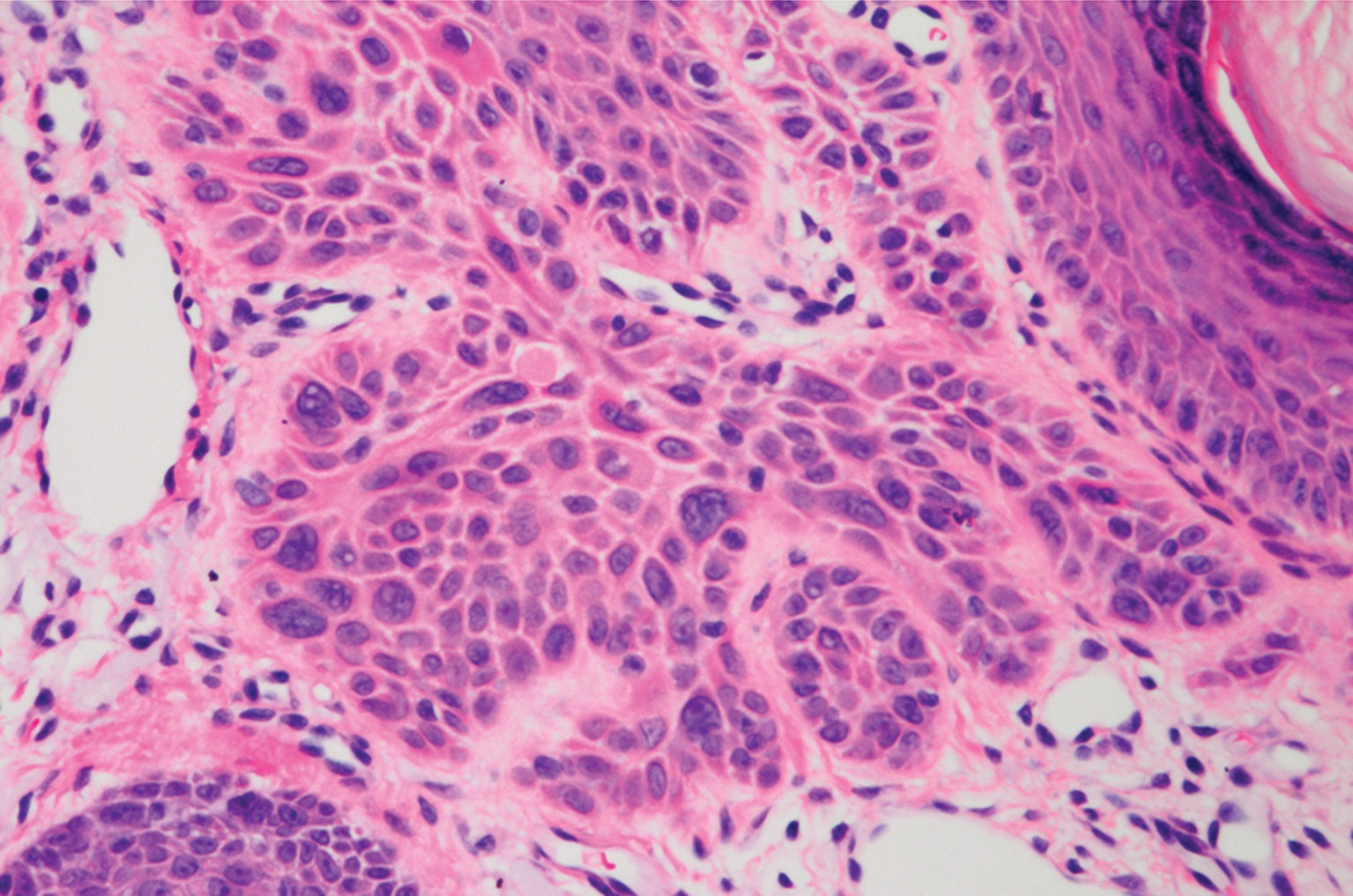
High magnification demonstrates the pleomorphism of the invading keratinocytes

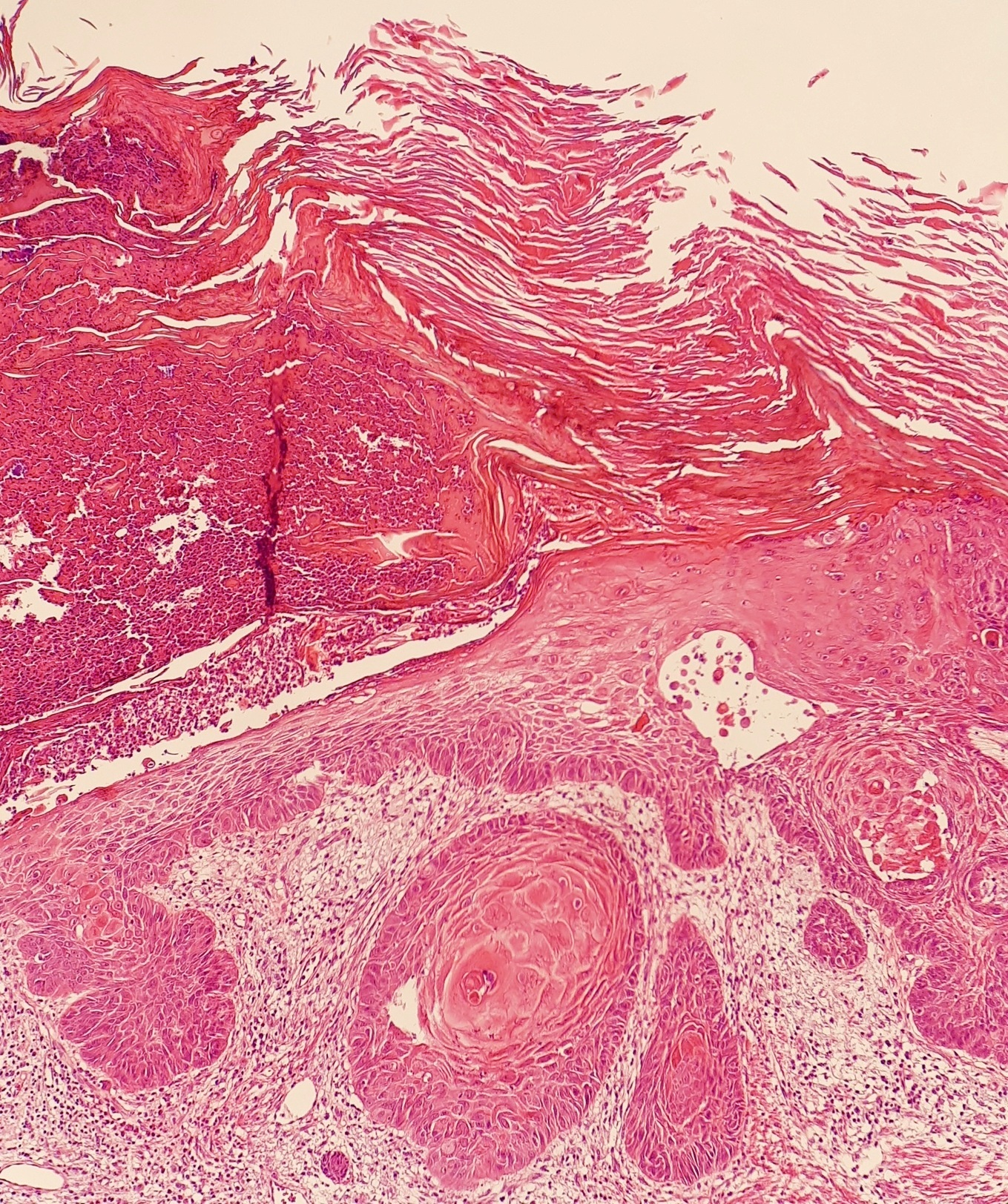
Invasive nests with characteristic large celled centers. Ulceration (at left) is common in invasive cSCC.

=== Degree of differentiation ===
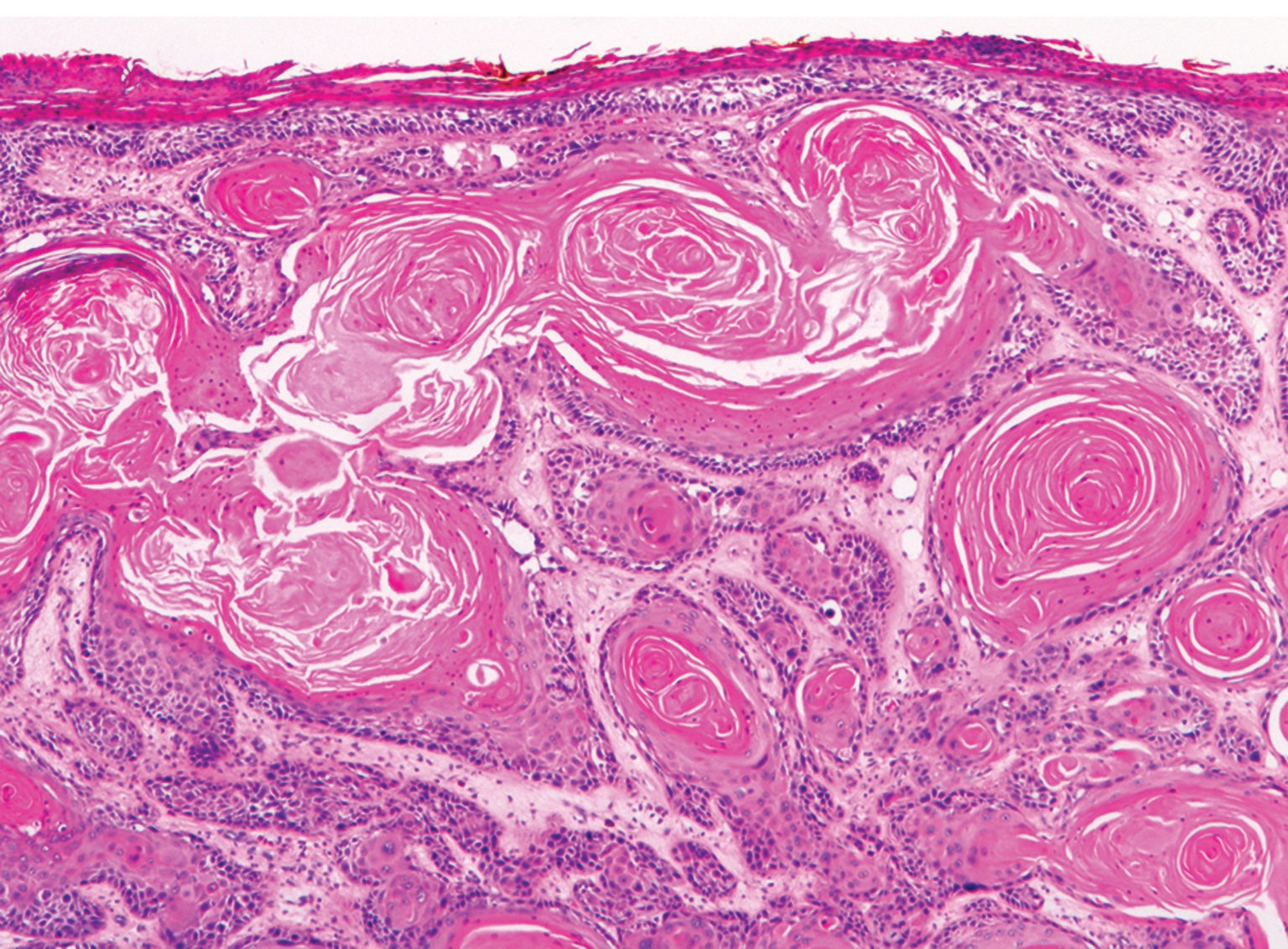
Well-differentiated (yet invasive) cSCC, showing prominent keratinization. It may form pearl-like structures where dermal nests of keratinocytes attempt to mature in a layered fashion. Well-differentiated cSCC has slightly enlarged hyperchromatic nuclei with abundant amounts of cytoplasm. Intercellular bridges will frequently be visible.

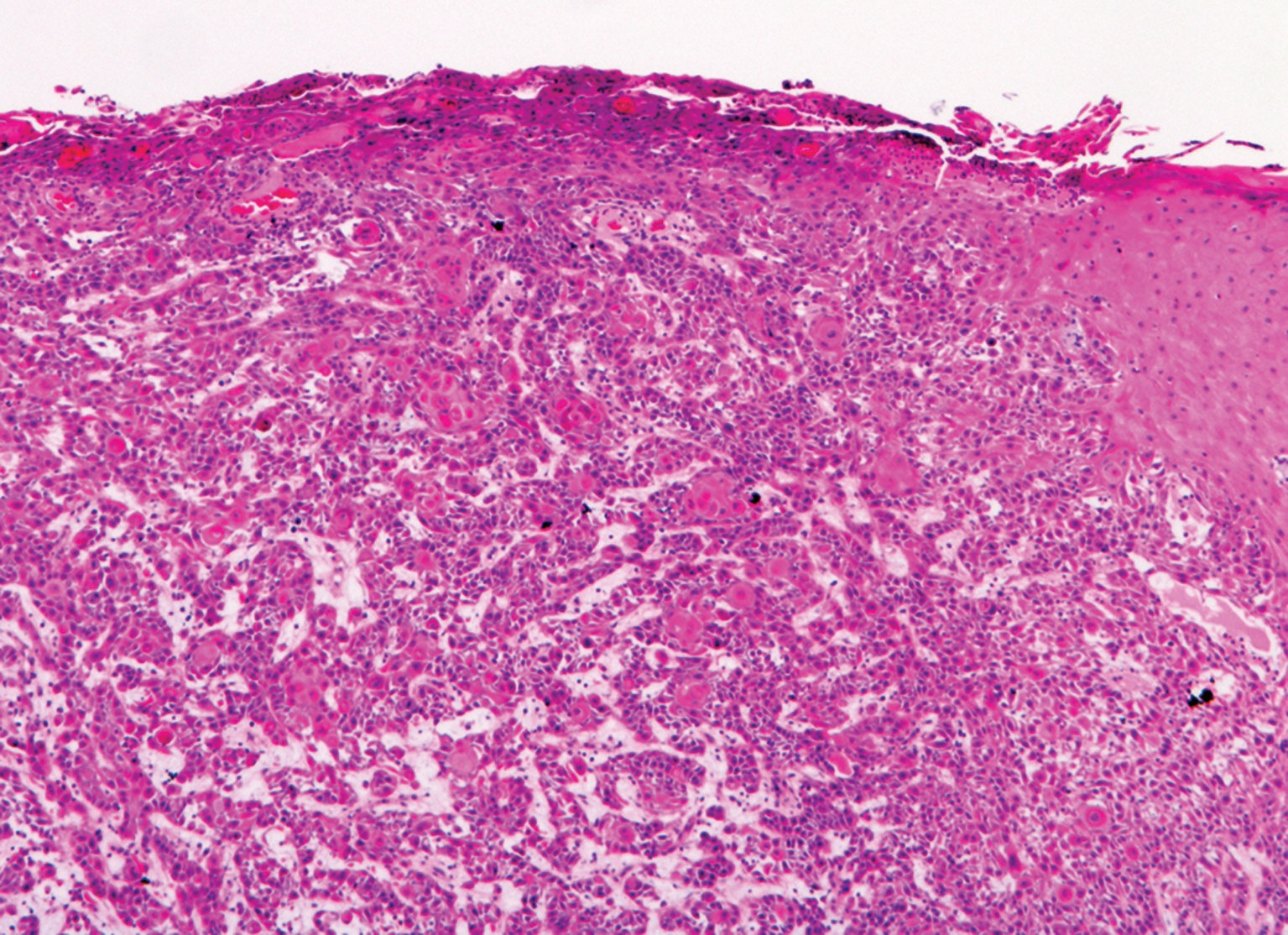
Moderately differentiated lesions of invasive cSCC show much less organization and maturation with significantly less keratin formation.

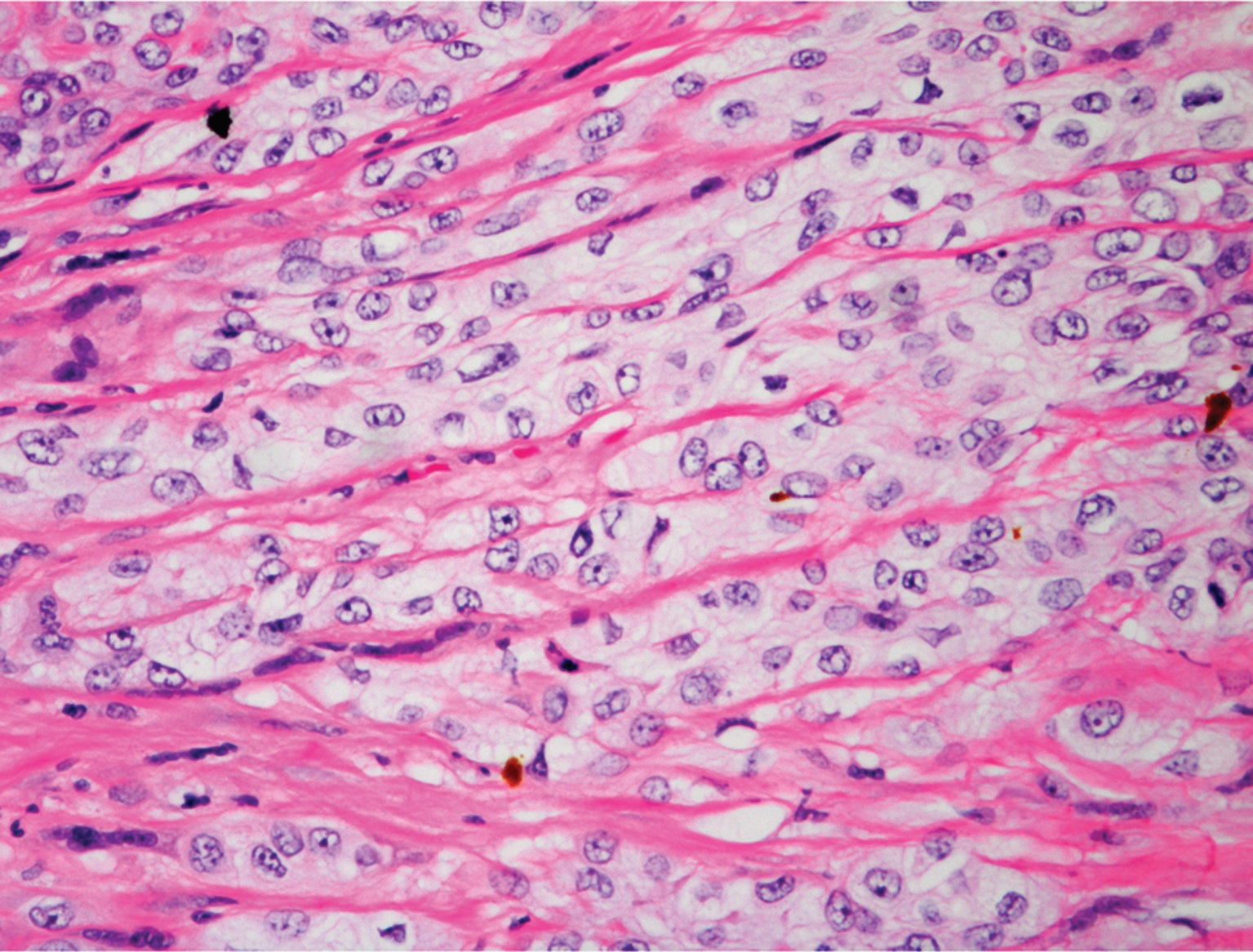
Poorly differentiated, where attempts at keratinization are often no longer evident. This is a clear-cell squamous-cell carcinoma. The dysplastic cells infiltrated cords through the dermis. Poorly differentiated cSCC has greatly enlarged pleomorphic nuclei showing a high degree of atypia and frequent mitoses.

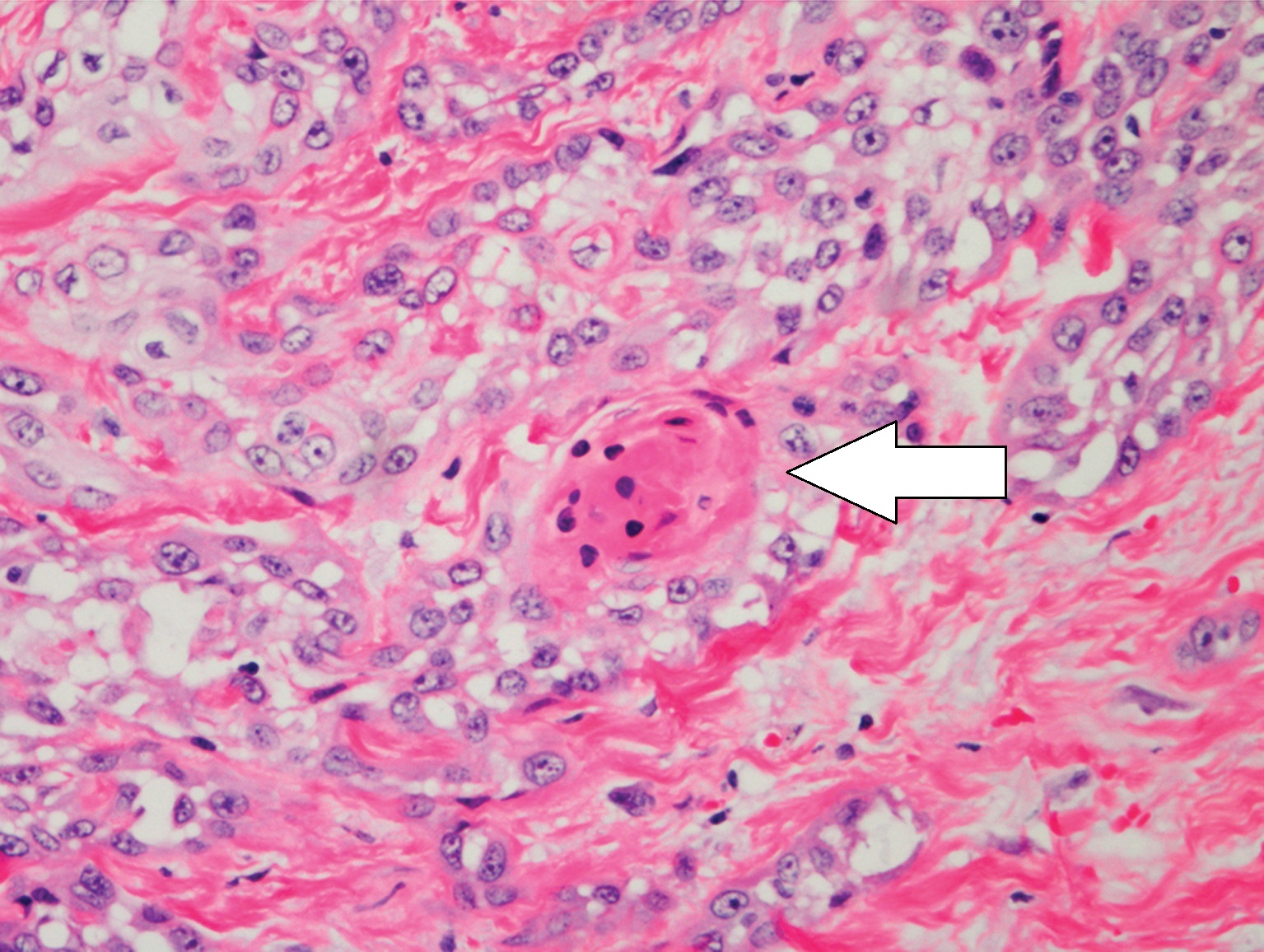
Poorly differentiated clear-cell squamous-cell carcinoma. For this type of cSCC, immunostains will likely be required to classify it unless other areas of the tumor show obvious squamous-cell features, such as seen here (arrow).

== Prevention ==
Appropriate sun-protective clothing, use of broad-spectrum (UVA/UVB) sunscreen with at least SPF 50, and avoidance of intense sun exposure may prevent skin cancer. A 2016 review of sunscreen for preventing cutaneous squamous-cell carcinoma found insufficient evidence to demonstrate whether it was effective.

== Management ==
Most cutaneous squamous-cell carcinomas are removed with surgery. Smaller lesions which are lower risk may also be destroyed with electrodesiccation and curettage. Surgical excision with a free margin of healthy tissue (the margins of the excised skin being examined microscopically and found to be free of cancerous cells) is a frequent treatment modality. Standard excision with negative margins has a cure rate of 90-98% and electrodesiccation with curettage has cure rates of 95%. cSCC lesions that are higher risk are removed with wider free margins or using Mohs surgery. Mohs surgery involves examining the removed skin tissue histologically for cancerous cells at the time of surgery, and removing additional skin if cancer cells are found to involve the edges (free margins). Mohs surgery or standard surgical excision with wider margins is the recommended treatment for cSCC with high risk features.

Radiotherapy, given as external beam radiotherapy, can also be used to treat cSCC. Radiation therapy is often used afterward in high-risk cancer or patient types. Radiation or radiotherapy can also be a standalone option in treating cSCC in those who are not candidates for surgery. Some studies showed improved cancer-free survival and overall survival in those with head and neck cSCC with nerve involvement who received radiation therapy after surgery. Also, radiation therapy after surgery is associated with improved survival in those with cSCC and lymph node involvement. The benefit of radiation therapy after surgery in lower risk disease is unclear. There is little evidence comparing the effectiveness of different treatments for non-metastatic cSCC.

Certain forms of high risk disease including recurrent cSCC, locally advanced cancer that is not treatable with surgery, regionally invasive cancer, or cancer with distant metastasis are treated with systemic therapy. The standard chemotherapy regiment for cSCC is cisplatin or carboplatin with or without paclitaxel. Immunotherapy using targeted Programmed cell death protein 1 (PD-1) inhibitors are used to arrest cancer cells in the cell cycle, inhibiting growth. This includes drugs such as pembrolizumab, nivolumab, or cosibelimab. PD-1 inhibitors have a 34-52% cancer response rate with the response rate being greater in tumor cells with a high mutation rate.

Treatment options for cSCC in situ (Bowen's disease) include photodynamic therapy with 5-aminolevulinic acid, cryotherapy, topical 5-fluorouracil or imiquimod, and excision. A meta-analysis showed evidence that PDT is more effective than cryotherapy and has better cosmetic outcomes. There is generally a lack of evidence comparing the effectiveness of all treatment options.

In general, squamous-cell carcinomas have a high risk of local recurrence, and up to 50% do recur. Seventy to 80% of cSCCs recur within 2 years of treatment. Periodic skin exams are recommended after treatment.

== Prognosis ==
The long-term outcome of squamous-cell carcinoma is dependent upon several factors: the subtype of the carcinoma, available treatments, location and severity, and various patient health-related variables (accompanying diseases, age, etc.). Generally, the long-term outcome is positive, with a metastasis rate of 1.9-5.2% and a mortality rate of 1.5-3.4%. Lesions that are greater than 2 mm in depth, or invading beyond the subcutaneous fat, invading local nerves or lymph nodes, having a diameter of more than 2 cm, arising from a scar, or arising from the temple, ear, or lips are associated with a greater risk of metastasis. Lesions comprising cells that are poorly differientiated (cancer cells that are poorly organized and highly abnormal as compared to normal tissue) are also associated with a greater risk of metastasis.

When it does metastasize, the most commonly involved organs are the lungs, brain, bone and other skin locations. For squamous-cell carcinoma occurring in immunosuppressed people (such as those with organ transplant, human immunodeficiency virus infection, or chronic lymphocytic leukemia), the risk of developing cSCC and having metastasis is much higher than in the general population. The risk of metastasis in those who are immunosuppressed is 7.3% in cSCC of the body, and 11% of cSCC of the head and neck. Other population based studies estimate the risk of cSCC metastasis being 2.7-5 times higher in those who are immunocompromized.

One study found squamous-cell carcinoma of the penis had a much greater rate of mortality (23%) than some other forms of squamous-cell carcinoma. This relatively high mortality rate may be due to delayed diagnosis of the disease due to people avoiding genital exams until the disease is more advanced, or fear of a possibly scarring operation upon the genitalia.

== Epidemiology ==
Age-standardized death from melanoma and other skin cancers per 100,000 inhabitants in 2004. no data less than 0.7 0.7–1.4 1.4–2.1 2.1–2.8 2.8–3.5 3.5–4.2 4.2–4.9 4.9–5.6 5.6–6.3 6.3–7 7–7.7 more than 7.7

The incidence of cutaneous squamous-cell carcinoma continues to rise around the world. This is theorized to be due to several factors, including an aging population, a greater incidence of those who are immunocompromised, and the increasing use of tanning beds.

A recent study estimated that there were between 180,000 and 400,000 cases of cSCC in the United States in 2013. Risk factors for cSCC vary with age, gender, race, geography, and genetics. The incidence of cSCC increases with age, and those 75 years or older are at a 5-to 10-fold increased risk of developing cSCC as compared with those who are younger than 55 years old. Males are affected with cSCC at a ratio of 3:1 in comparison to females. Those who have light skin, red or blonde hair, and light-colored eyes are also at increased risk.

Squamous-cell carcinoma of the skin can be found on all areas of the body but is most common on frequently sun-exposed areas, such as the face, legs and arms. Solid organ transplant recipients (heart, lung, liver, pancreas, among others) are also at a heightened risk of developing aggressive, high-risk cSCC. There are also a few rare congenital diseases predisposed to cutaneous malignancy. In certain geographic locations, exposure to arsenic in well water or from industrial sources may significantly increase the risk of cSCC.

== Additional images ==
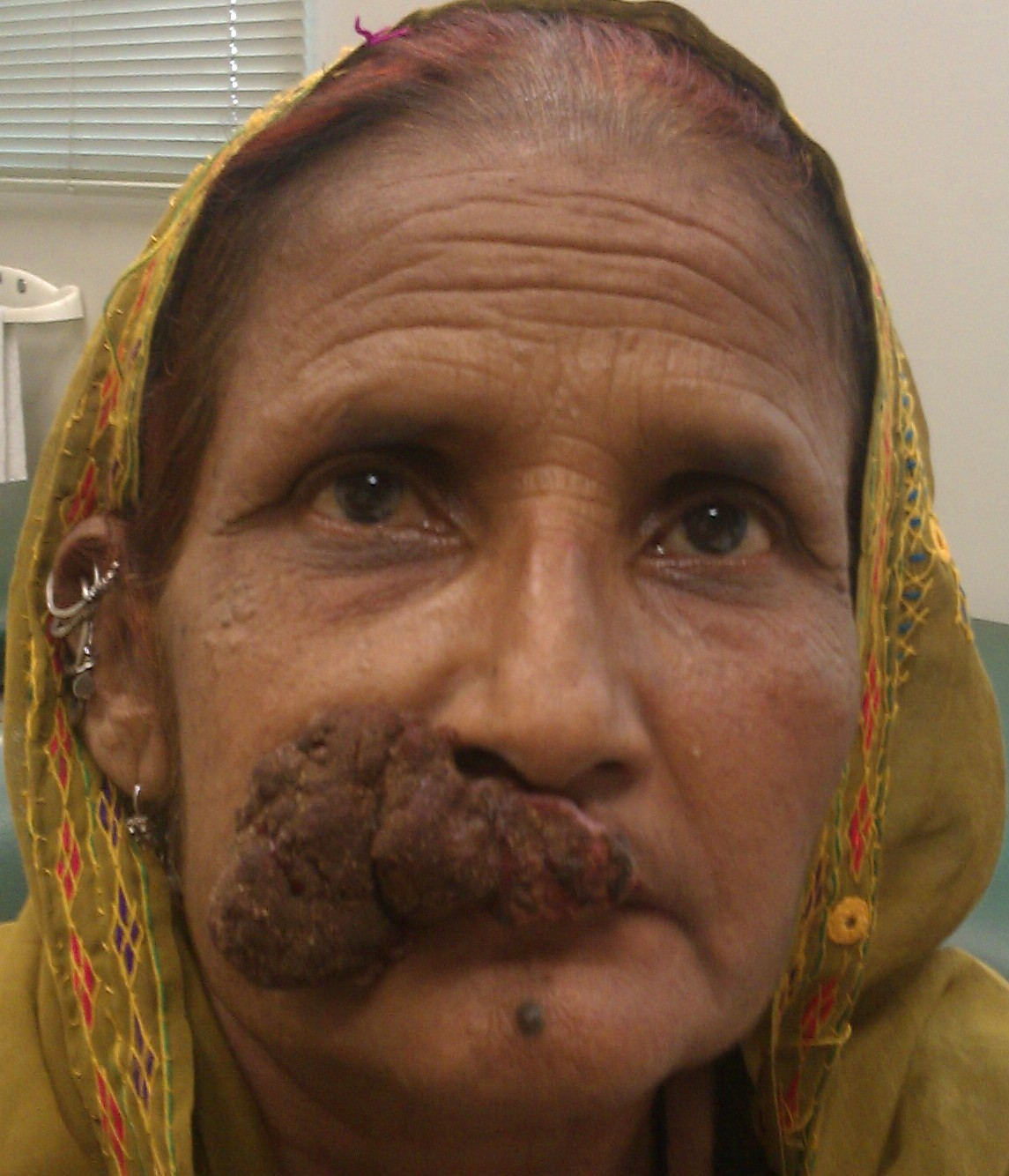
Biopsy-proven cutaneous squamous-cell carcinoma

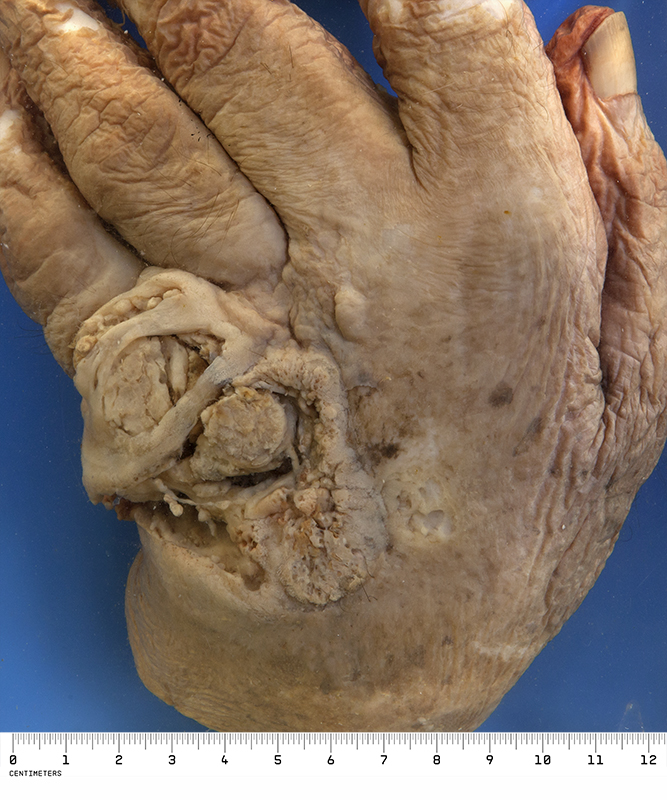
Squamous-cell carcinoma of the dorsum of the hand

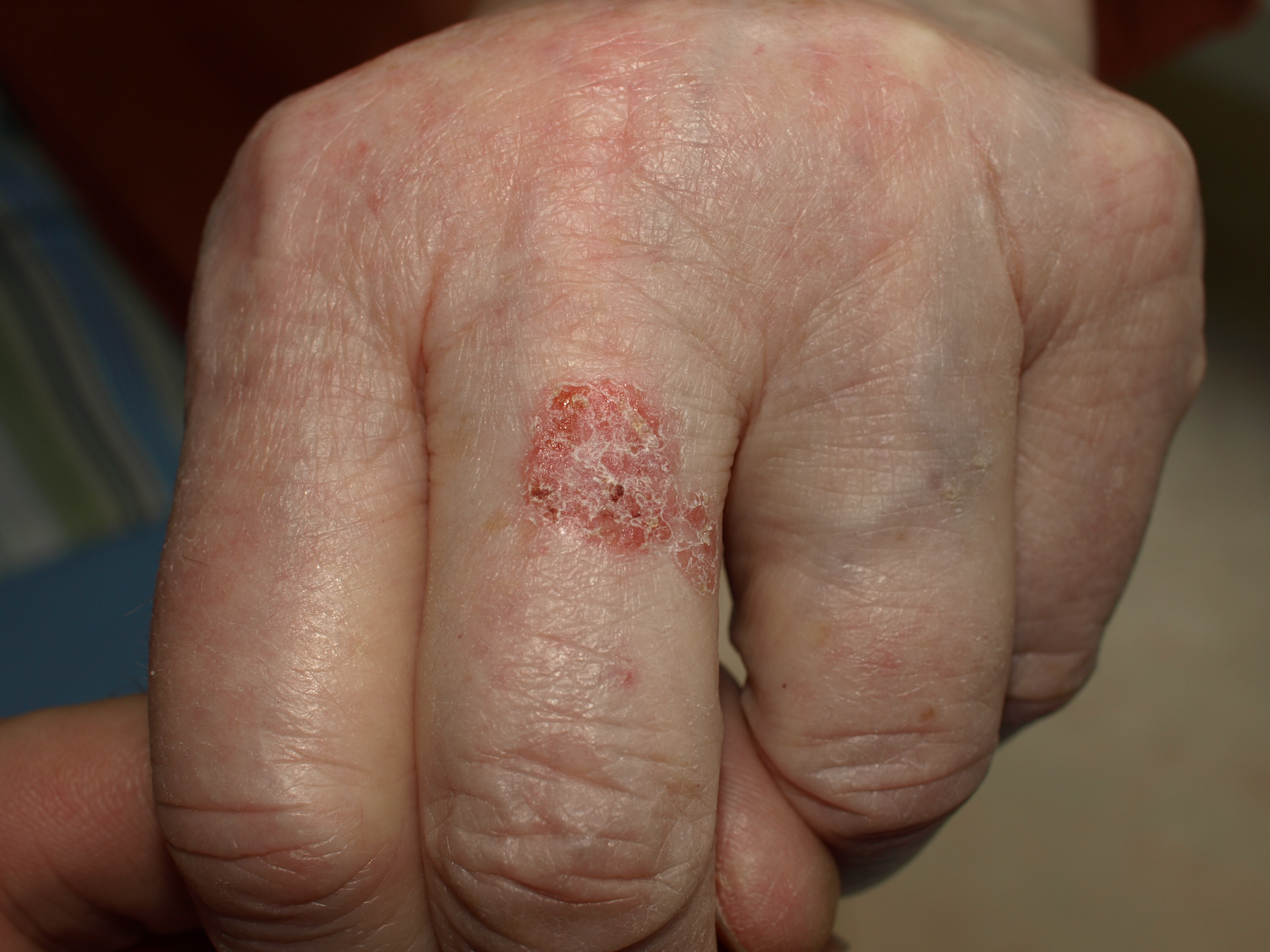
cSCC in situ (Bowen's disease)

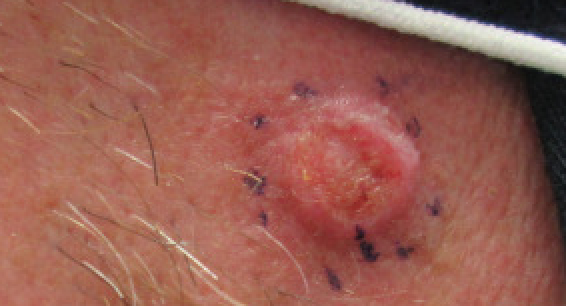
cSCC of the right upper cheek; lesion outlined in blue with a dashed line prior to biopsy

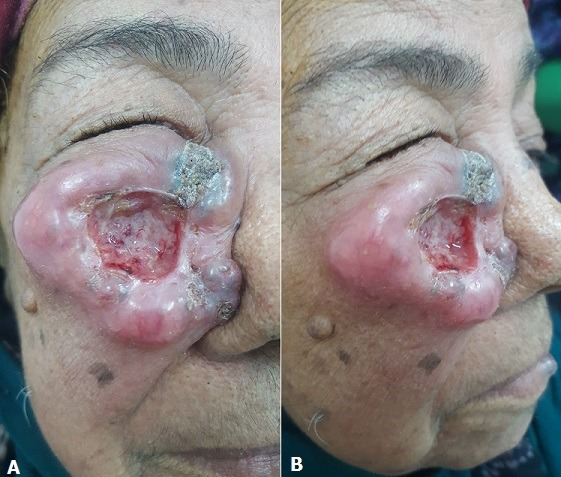
Giant squamous cell carcinoma of the cheek

== See also ==
- List of cutaneous conditions associated with increased risk of nonmelanoma skin cancer
