= Department of Health Services =

Department of Health Services may refer to:

- Arizona Department of Health Services
- Los Angeles County Department of Health Services
- The California Department of Health Services, superseded by the California Health and Human Services Agency
- Wisconsin Department of Health Services
