= Tucson Festival of Books =

Annual book fair

- Tucson Festival of Books logo

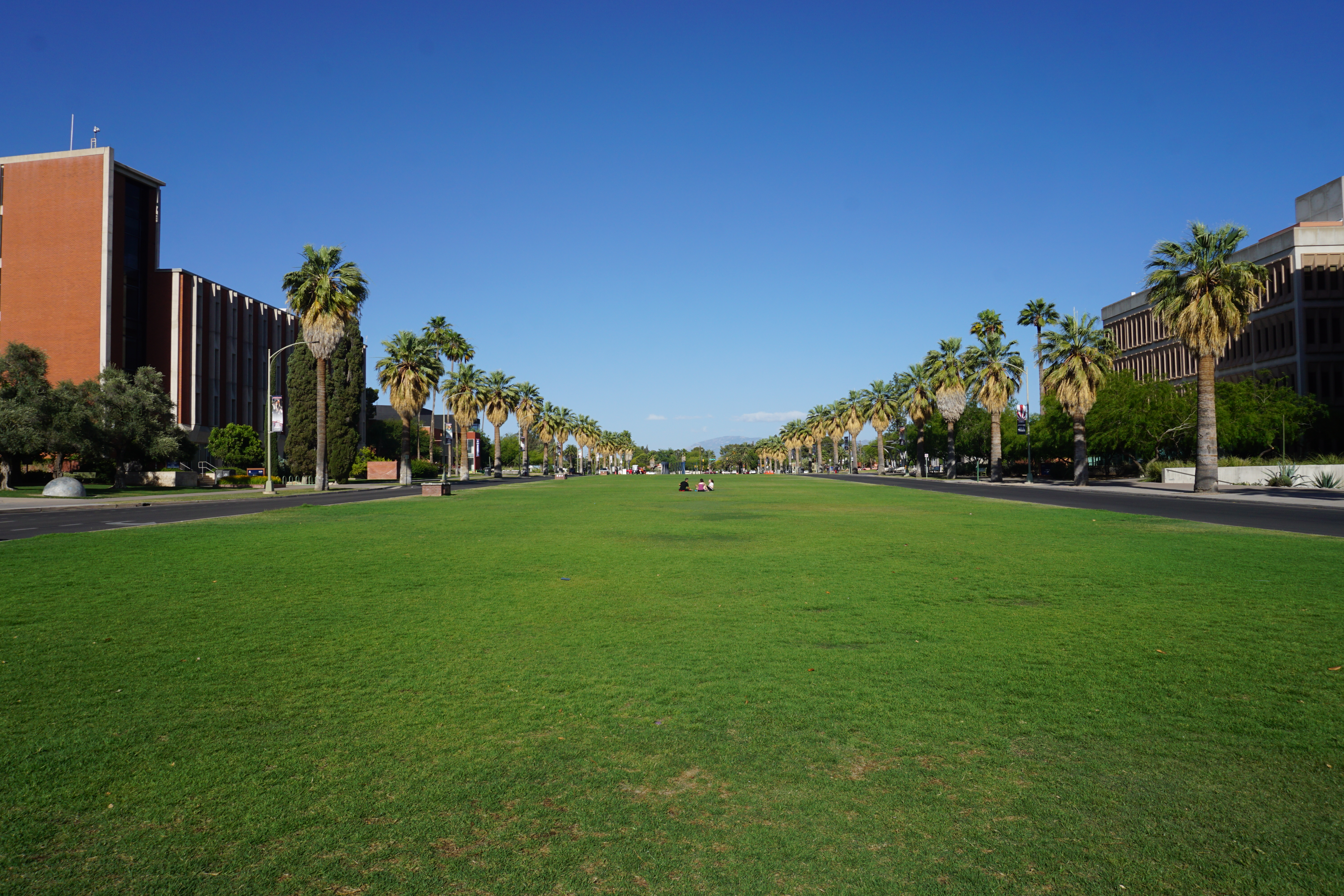
- The University of Arizona mall
- Begins: March 14, 2026
- Ends: March 15, 2026
- Frequency: Annually
- Venue: University of Arizona
- Location: Tucson, Arizona
- Country: United States
- Years active: 2009-present
- Inaugurated: March 14, 2009; 17 years ago
- Founders: Bill Viner, Brenda Viner, Frank Farias, John M. Humenik, Bruce Beach
- Most recent: March 16, 2025
- Participants: 130,000 (2024)
- Attendance: 2,360,000 (cumulative)
- Organizer: The Tucson Festival of Books Foundation
- Filing status: 501(c)(3) non-profit organization
- Sponsors: Arizona Daily Star (named), University of Arizona (named), Tucson Medical Center (presenting)
- Website: tucsonfestivalofbooks.org

The Tucson Festival of Books is a free annual book fair held in Tucson, Arizona during the second weekend in March. It was established in 2009 by Bill Viner, Frank Farias, John M. Humenik, Bruce Beach, and Brenda Viner. The event is primarily sponsored by the University of Arizona, which hosts the festival, and the Arizona Daily Star.

The first annual festival featured around 450 authors and welcomed over 50,000 regional visitors. The largest Festivals in 2018 and 2019 reached an estimated attendance of 140,000, and the most recent iteration almost returned to pre-pandemic levels with an estimated 130,000 visitors in 2024.

== Purpose and history ==
The event typically includes special programming for children and teens, panels by best-selling and emerging authors, a literary circus, culturally diverse programs, a poetry venue, exhibitor booths and two food courts. The Festival's mission is to improve literacy rates among children and adults in Southern Arizona. Since its creation, the Festival has donated over $2.36 million to agencies that improve literacy in the community such as Reading Seed, Literacy Connects, and University of Arizona Literacy Outreach Programs.

In addition to aiding the fight against illiteracy, the festival also helps the local community tremendously. In a study by a students at the Eller College of Management at the University of Arizona, the festival was found to pump an estimated $4 million into Tucson’s economy annually. The festival has also been covered by C-SPAN, with over 120 videos in the C-SPAN Video Library.

The 2020 edition of the event was cancelled due to the COVID-19 pandemic. The event was held virtually in 2021.

== Festivals by year ==
Each year, the Festival appoints an animal native to the Sonoran Desert as its mascot. In 2011, the Founders Award was established to recognize "literary achievement that captivated [the] imagination and whose body of work will be an inspiration to readers, writers, and booklovers".

Year	Estimated Attendance	Mascot	Founders Award
2009	50,000	gila monster	not awarded
2010	80,000	hummingbird	not awarded
2011	100,000	tarantula	Elmore Leonard
2012	120,000	Sonoran green toad	Larry McMurtry & Diana Ossana
2013	120,000	butterfly	R. L. Stine
2014	130,000	quail	Richard Russo
2015	130,000	bobcat	The Rock Bottom Remainders
2016	135,000	jackrabbit	J. A. Jance
2017	135,000	roadrunner	T. C. Boyle
2018	140,000	coyote	Billy Collins
2019	140,000	javelina	Luís Alberto Urrea
2020	festival canceled due to COVID-19		
2021	unknown (online)	owl	Lisa See
2022	100,000	prairie dog	Annette Gordon-Reed
2023	125,000	raccoon	Thomas Perry
2024	130,000	coatimundi	T. Jefferson Parker
2025	TBD	Mexican free-tailed bat	Craig Johnson

== Gallery ==
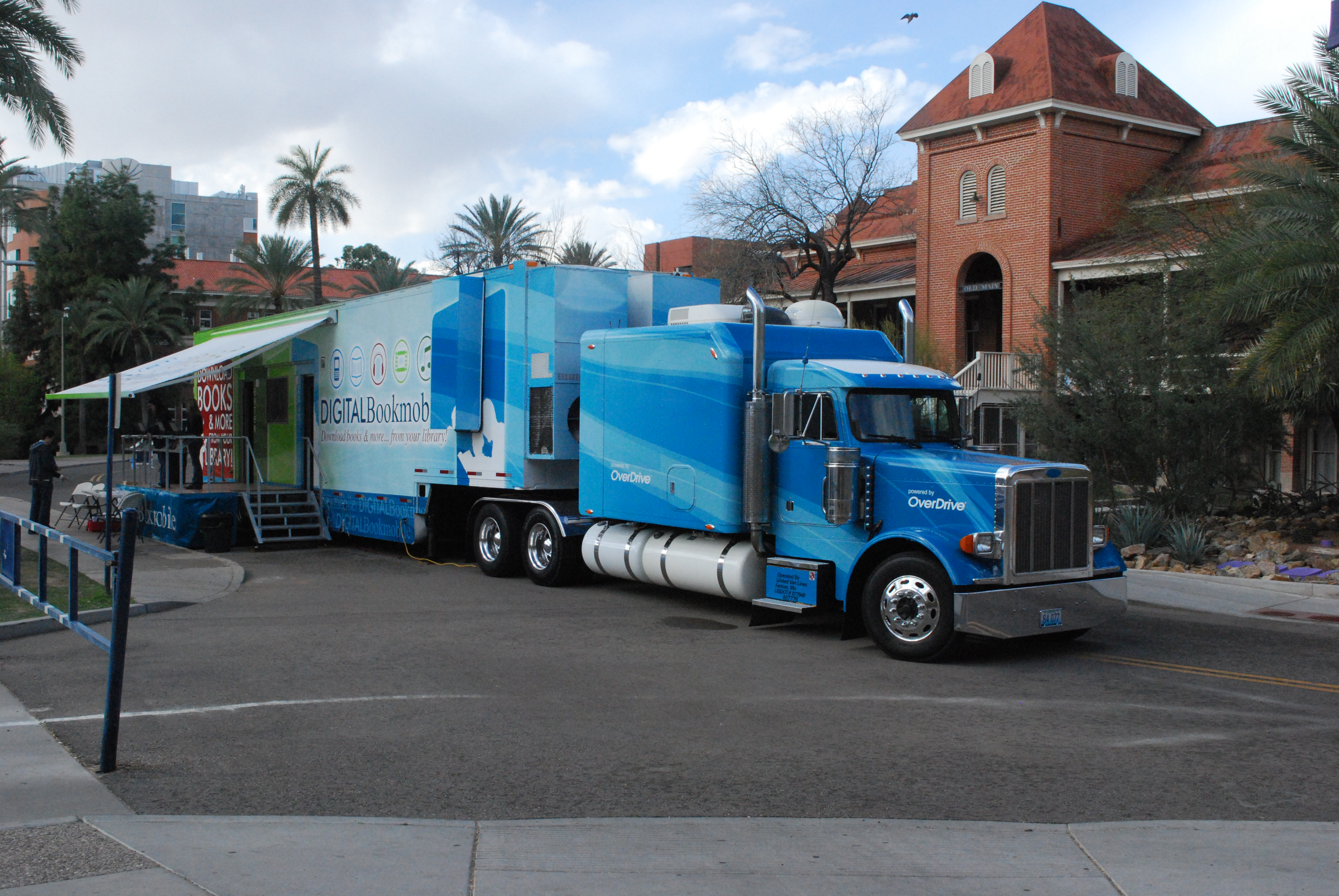
2009 Tucson Festival of Books

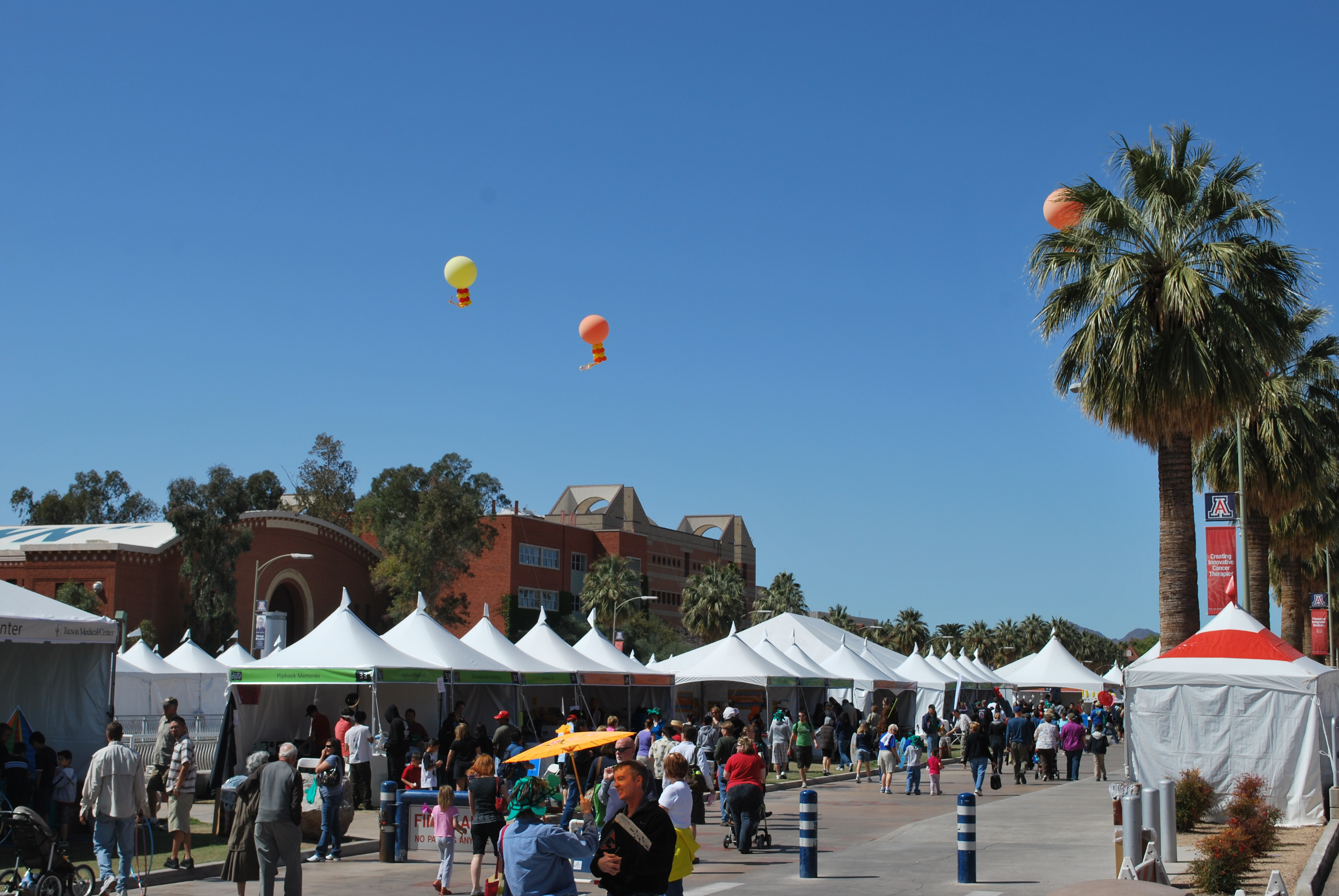
2010 Tucson Festival of Books

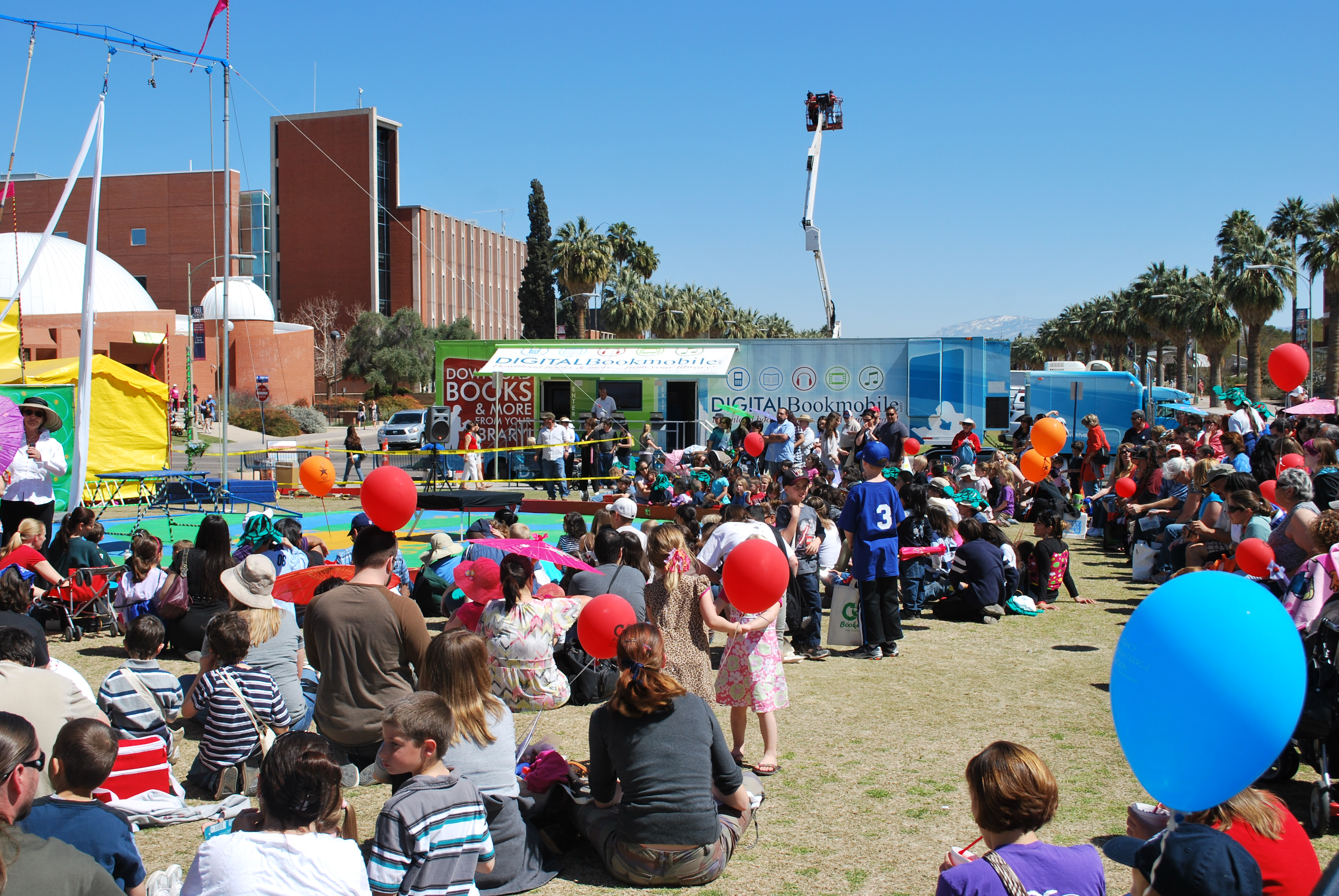
2010 Tucson Festival of Books Event

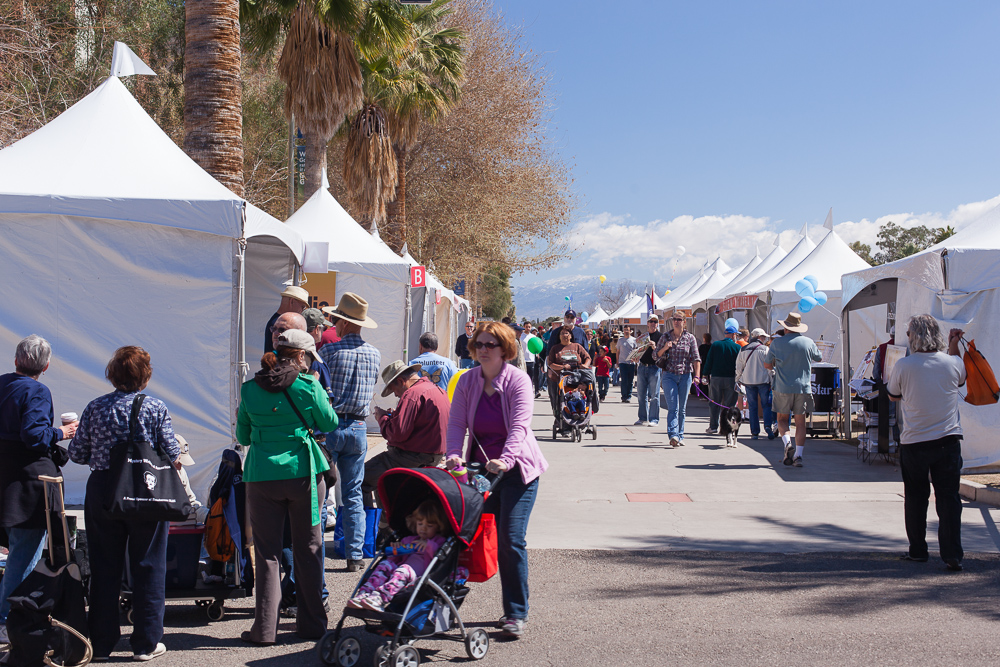
2013 Tucson Festival of Books

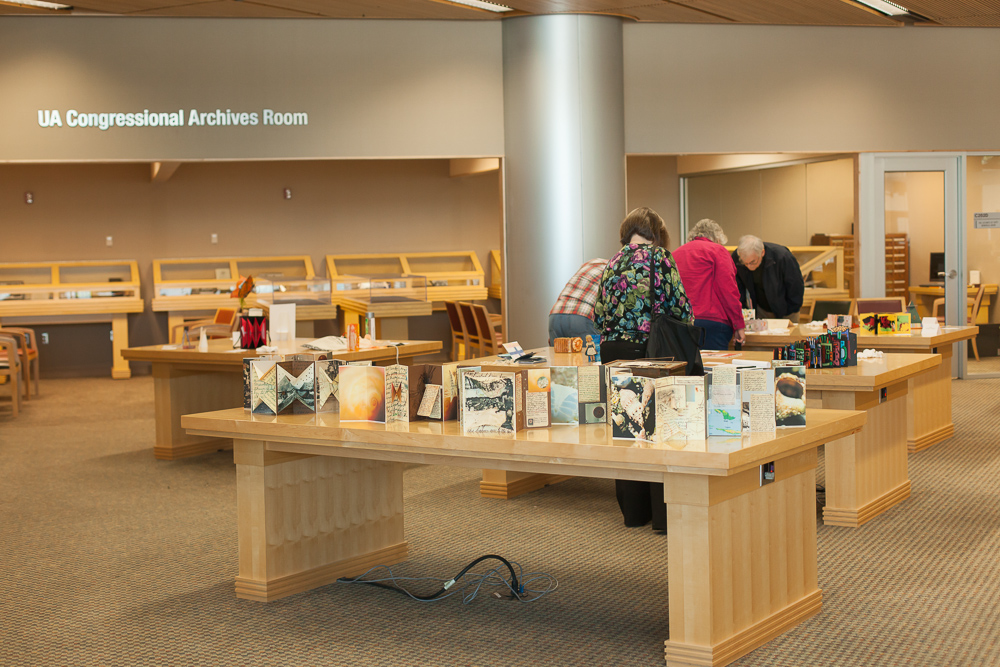
PaperWorks Exhibit at 2013 Tucson Festival of Books

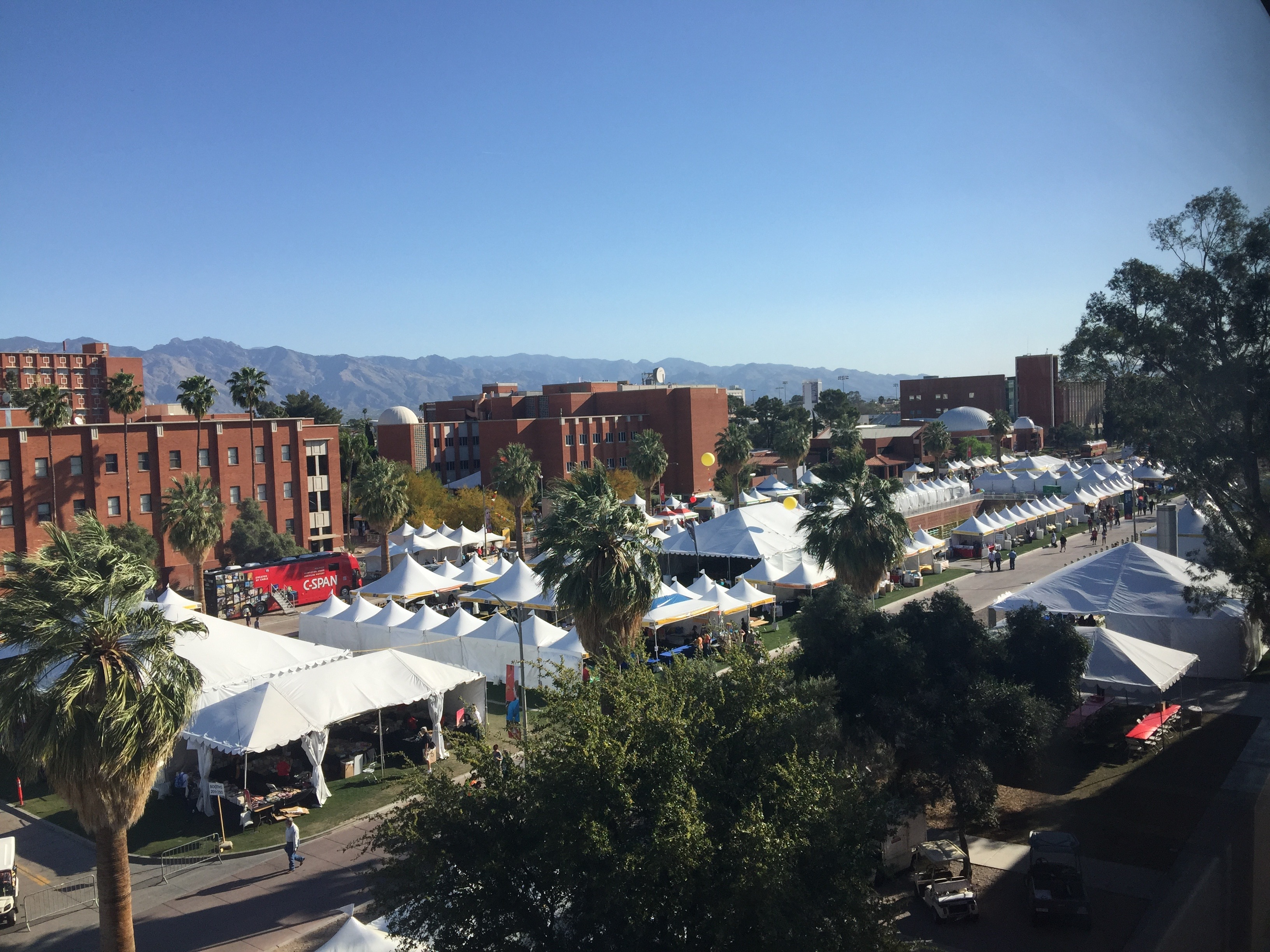
2015 Festival of Books

== See also ==
- Books in the United States
