= Yuma Regional Medical Center =

Hospital in Yuma, Arizona, USA

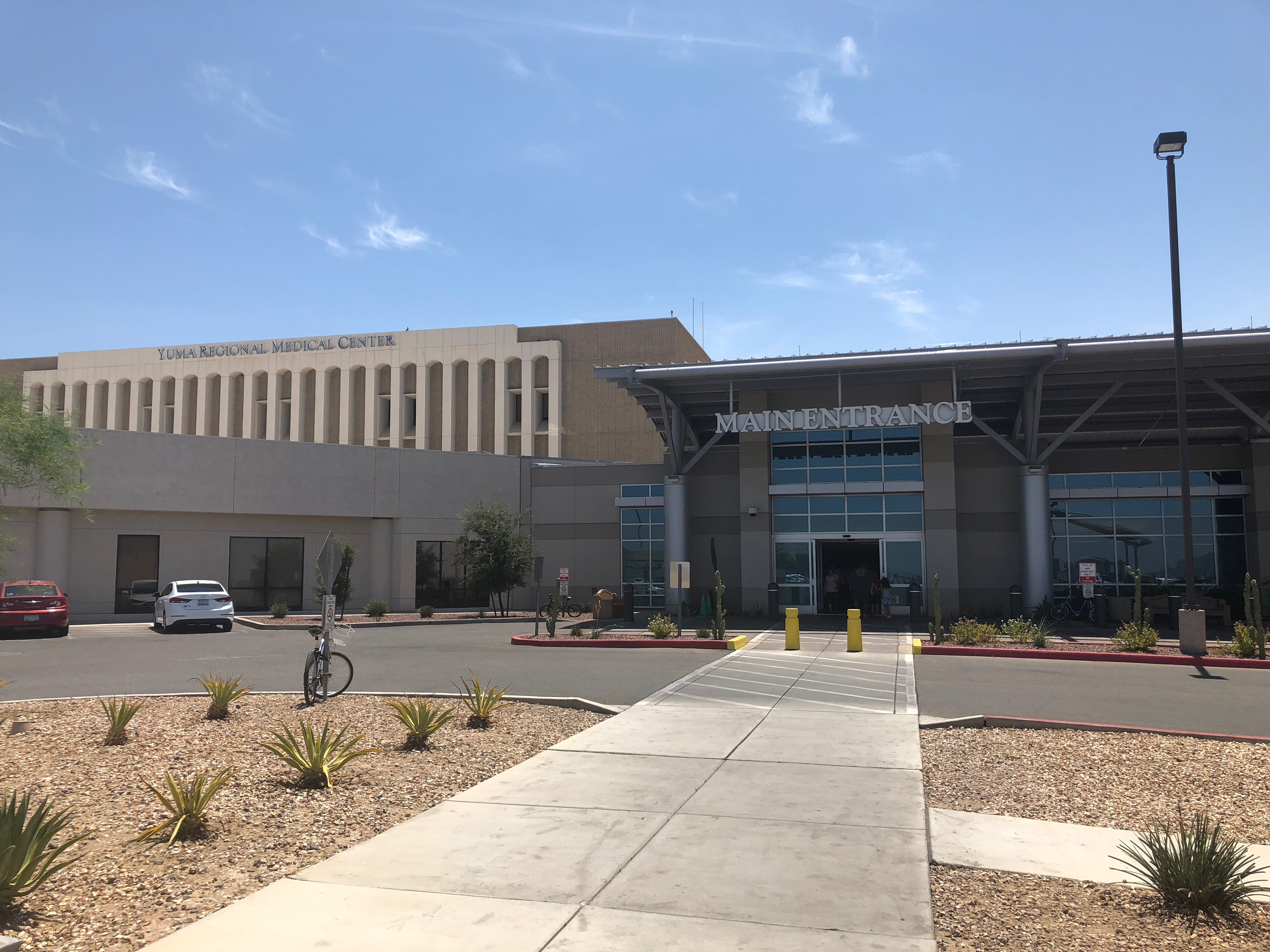
- Main entrance at YRMC.

Geography
- Location: Yuma, Arizona, U.S.
- Coordinates: 32.6835°N 114.6336°W

Organisation
- Care system: Private
- Type: General, Teaching

Services
- Emergency department: Level IV
- Beds: 406

Helipads
- Helipad: FAA LID: 05AZ

History
- Founded: 1958

Links
- Website: YRMC's Website
- Lists: Hospitals in U.S.

Onvida Heath, formerly known as Yuma Regional Medical Center, is a hospital in Yuma, Arizona, United States. It began operations in 1958 under the name Parkview Hospital.

== History ==
Yuma Regional Medical Center was founded as Parkview Hospital in 1958. In 1961, the Baptist Hospital Association of Arizona assumed management of the hospital and renamed it Parkview Baptist Hospital. In 1972, management of the hospital was transferred to the Yuma community, which renamed it Yuma Regional Medical Center. In 2004, a new six-story hospital tower was completed, adding a 42-bed ICU, a heart center, and over 140 new regular beds. In 2013, YRMC became a teaching facility with the addition of a graduate medical education (GME) program in Family and Community Medicine.

In July 2014, the Yuma Regional Cancer Center was opened. The Center provides comprehensive cancer care. In 2018, the center was certified by the Commission on Cancer, a part of the American College of Surgeons. In November 2020 during the COVID-19 pandemic, the hospital did not allow an emergency physician, Cleavon Gilman, to continue work due to his providing information on social media about the COVID-19 pandemic in Arizona. Subsequently, in December 2020 the hospital faced a critical staffing shortage. In October 9, 2024, the Yuma Regional Medical Center was rebranded into Onvida Health.

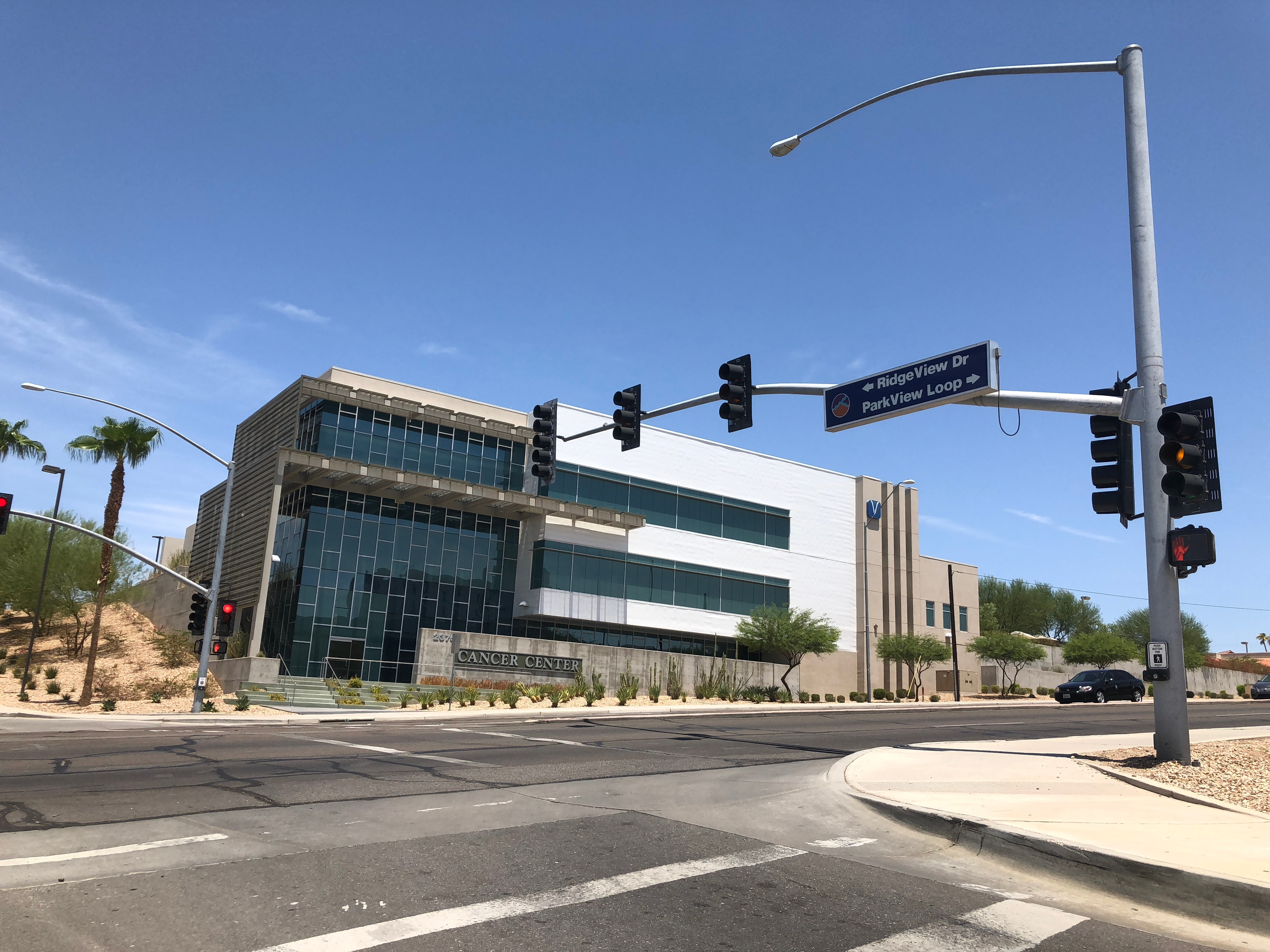
Cancer Center at YRMC

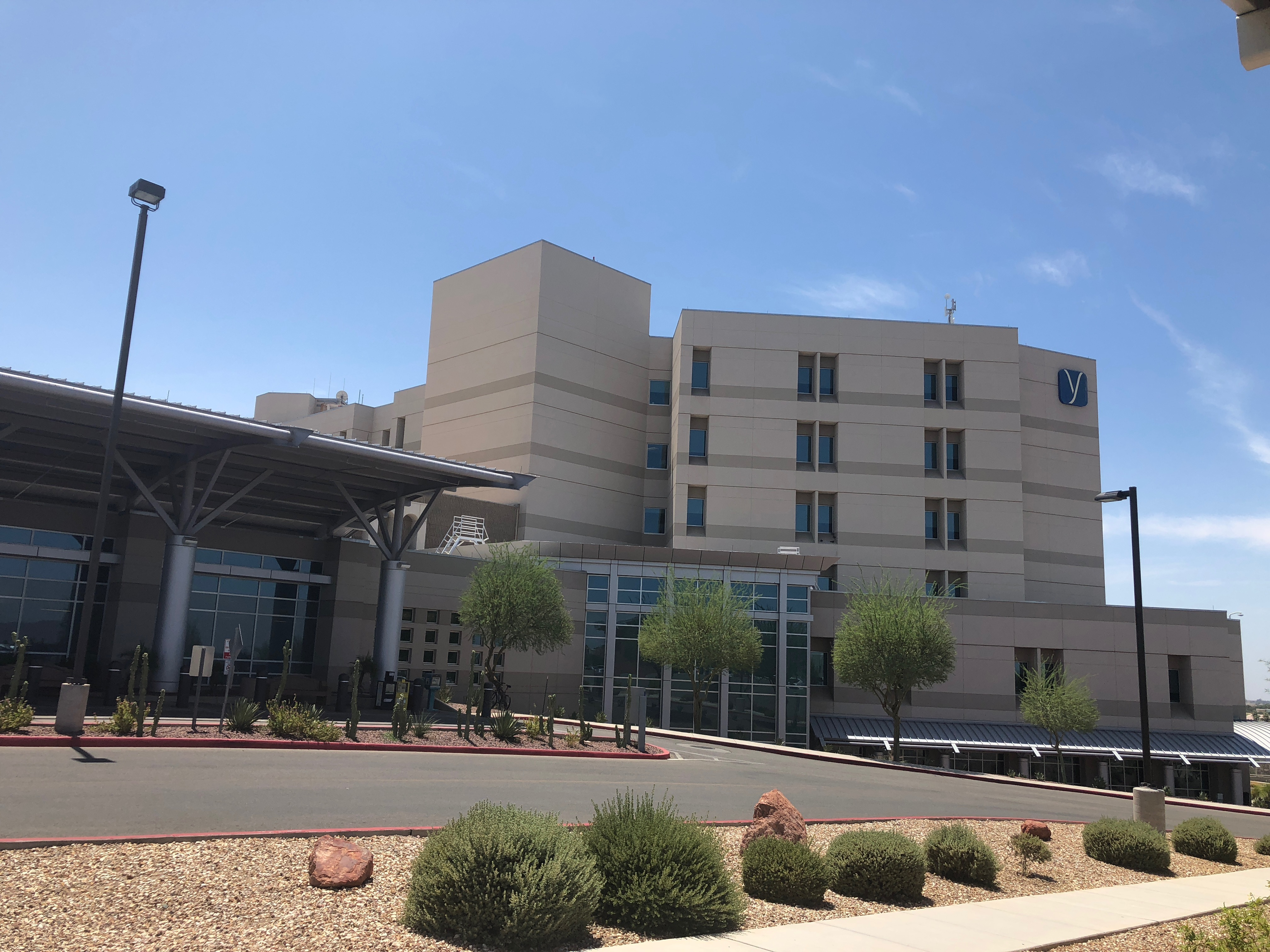
Hospital Tower at YRMC

== Services ==
=== Specialties ===
Specialties available include:

- Diabetes & Endocrinology
- Gastroenterology & GI Surgery
- Interventional Radiology
- Geriatrics
- Nephrology
- Neurology & Neurosurgery
- Orthopedics
- Pulmonology
- Urology

=== Procedures and conditions ===
Some of the procedures that are performed include:

- Abdominal aortic aneurysm repair
- Aortic valve replacement surgery
- Chronic Obstructive Pulmonary Disease
- Colorectal surgery
- Heart bypass surgery
- Heart failure
- Hip replacement
- Knee replacement
- Lung cancer treatment, including lung lobectomy

== Leadership ==
The following comprise the Executive Leadership Team:

Name	Position
Robert Trenschel	President & Chief Executive Officer
Bharat Magu	Chief Medical Officer
Deborah Aders	Chief Nursing Officer; Vice President of Patient Care Services
David Willie	Chief Financial Officer
Fredrick Peet	Chief Information Officer
Justin Farren	Vice President of Ambulatory Operations
Machele Headington	Vice President of Marketing & Communications
Trudie Milner	Vice President of Operations
Robert Seibel	General Counsel
