= Canyon State Academy =

Boarding school in Maricopa County, Arizona

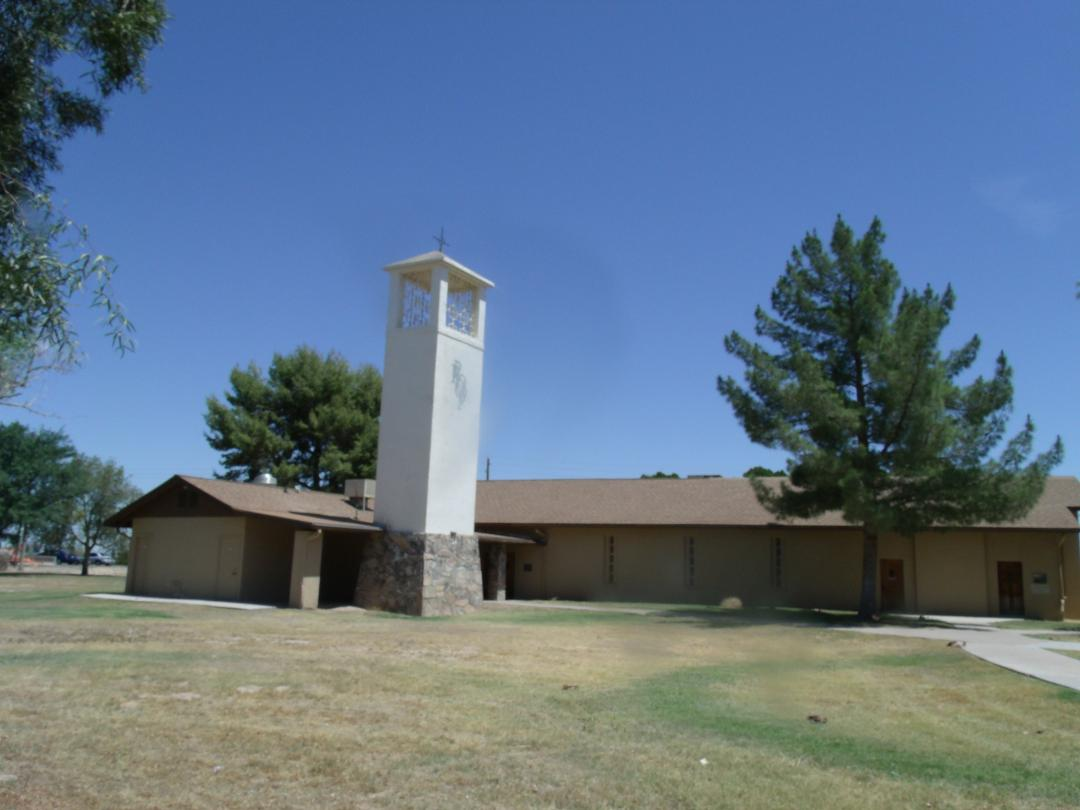
- Canyon State Academy in 2013

Location
- 20061 E. Rittenhouse Road; Queen Creek, Arizona 85142; United States; 33°15′50″N 111°39′01″W

Information
- Former name: Arizona Boys Ranch
- School type: Private boarding school
- Grades: 9–12
- Enrollment: 214 (October 1, 2012)
- Colors: Maroon and gray
- Mascot: Rams
- Accreditation: North Central Association
- Website: canyonstateacademy.com

Canyon State Academy is a private residential school serving male youth between the ages of 11–17 with a history of delinquent behaviors, dependent/neglectful backgrounds, mild mental and emotional health issues, and special education needs. Situated in Queen Creek, Arizona, its 180-acre campus includes a variety of programs, from temporary shelter to long-term residence. It is managed by Rite of Passage, which provides a variety of programs and services to at-risk youth throughout the nation. The school is a member of the Canyon Athletic Association.

== History ==
=== Arizona Boys Ranch ===
The school started as the Arizona Boys Ranch (ABR) in 1948 and later grew to include eight facilities in Oracle, Queen Creek, and elsewhere. The original mascot in the ABR era was the Spartans, and colors were green and white. This was a nod to Frank Kush, a Michigan State University alumnus, who helped start the football program in 1994.

Almost immediately after its foundation, ABR football was a successful program. From 1995 to 1997, it had three nearly undefeated seasons — it only lost to one team, Blue Ridge High School from Pinetop-Lakeside, but it faced the Yellow Jackets three consecutive years in the 3A title game and lost. From 1995 to early September 1998, no school would beat ABR except for Blue Ridge; this streak was broken when another emerging football power, Chandler's Hamilton High School, beat the Spartans on their own turf. It was the first time ever that the visiting school won in a game played at the Boys Ranch.

On March 2, 1998, Nicholaus Contreraz died at the Boys Ranch due to abusive conditions. On August 27, 1998, the Boys Ranch lost its operating license. It was later reinstated (by October 7), but the effects echoed. Once an AIA 3A school whose enrollment had reached 458 students in 1998, it had 45 students after California pulled out the students it sent to ABR (3/4ths of enrolled students), making it one of Arizona's smallest high schools. Its facility in Oracle and four other sites closed, centering activity on the Queen Creek location. Contreraz was the second death at the facility. In October 1998, an Arizona grand jury indicted 5 former staff members on child abuse and manslaughter charges, and 17 former staff members were placed on the Arizona Child Abuser Directory.

=== Canyon State Academy ===
In March 2000, the name of the school was changed to Canyon State Academy (CSA), ushering in a decade in which new owners Rite of Passage began to standardize the naming and colors of the school to match some of their other high school programs and to distance itself from the ABR era. Athletics reimaging climaxed with the changeover of colors and mascot from the ABR-era Spartans to maroon and gray and the Rams in 2005.

On January 21, 2020, 17-year-old boy, Jonathan Quiroz, died at Canyon State Academy after being found unresponsive. The teenager was found at about 11:30 p.m. when emergency personnel arrived at the school. He was transported to a hospital but died shortly after.

On July 1, 2020, Canyon State Academy officials said that 23 students and 8 staff members tested positive for COVID-19.

== See also ==
- George Fuller Miller Sr.
