= Nicholaus Contreraz =

American torture victim (1982–1998)

- Born: Nicholaus Contreraz; January 15, 1982; Sacramento, California, United States
- Died: March 2, 1998 (aged 16); Oracle, Arizona, United States
- Cause of death: Cardiac arrest
- Known for: Culpable homicide victim at a residential school

Nicholaus Contreraz (January 15, 1982 – March 2, 1998) was an American 16-year-old from Sacramento, California, who was tortured and murdered while attending the Arizona Boys Ranch in 1998. Contreraz had been incarcerated at the residential school's branch in Oracle, Arizona, where he was subject to severe physical abuse and willful neglect at the hands of staff members until dying from cardiac arrest.

Contreraz's death made national news in the United States, and while the staff escaped legal punishment due to technicalities, it highlighted systemic abuse at the Arizona Boys Ranch, and increased the criticism of private prisons.

== Background ==
Nick Contreraz's problems, according to his family, may have started with the death of his father, who was killed in a drive-by shooting that Nick witnessed. He ended up being removed from home and placed in foster care. He was then placed in his uncle's custody. On the day he died, he told staff members at the Boys Ranch that he had been sexually abused by a family member. He had stolen a car and then failed in rehab programs in Sacramento, and thus ended up at the ranch in the Arizona desert, which is the "last resort" before the California Division of Juvenile Justice.

The Arizona Boys Ranch was a privately-run boot camp-styled residential school system in Arizona for at-risk youth, including juvenile delinquents, and had historically enjoyed the support of prominent politicians. The schools received funding from the state of California, where the law prohibits staff in its juvenile institutions to physically restrain their wards, whereas the neighboring state of Arizona does not. Contreraz had been optimistic about attending and was supposedly going to be able to earn high school credit while there.

== Life at the Arizona Boys Ranch ==
Contreraz arrived at the facility near Oracle in Pinal County, Arizona, on January 8, 1998, at which time he was examined by Dr. Virginia Rutz. He had asthma, perhaps exacerbated by the change in elevation, and was prescribed inhalers by Dr. Rutz during his second and final visit with her one month later on February 8, but was forbidden to use them without the permission of facility staff. Around this time, Contreraz began experiencing nausea and diarrhea, but was told by staff members that it was "all in his mind" and that he was "a baby". During the two months there prior to his death, he lost 14 pounds in weight, suffered fevers of temperatures over 100 degrees, muscle spasms, and severe chest pains. Other documented symptoms included chills, sweating, rapid pulse and impaired breathing, dry heaves, cyanosis, coughing, wheezing, and "moldy" body odor. Contreraz was nevertheless accused of malingering by staff.

As his condition worsened, Contreraz's treatment became more extreme as staff members at the facility used physical exercises as a method of abuse, ordering him to do calisthenics, and when he faltered he would be shoved to the ground or punched. When he would pass out, the staff would throw water on him. It was also common for inmates at the facility to be denied the right to use the restroom, access only being allowed in the morning after breakfast, and in the evening after the completion of physical "training". He eventually reached a point of inability to control his bodily functions, soiling his clothes and mattress, which was moved into the barracks bathroom, where he was made to sleep in the clothes and on the mattress. Contreraz was ordered to drop his pants for the scrutiny of other inmates, and forced to eat his meals on the toilet. He was also forced to carry his vomit, urine and feces-covered clothes around with him in a trash receptacle, over which the staff would make him do push-ups. The vomiting and soilings became frequent, and he stated that he was "hurting all over". When staff could tell that a soiling or regurgitation were imminent, they would mockingly count down "three, two, one..." They also told other inmates that Contreraz had AIDS.

On February 27, a few days before he died, Contreraz was allowed to speak to his family on the telephone. His grandmother, Connie Woodward, later told The Arizona Republic newspaper that facility staff monitored the conversation which was held over speaker phone. They informed her that he had not eaten in a week but that it was not something about which she should be concerned.

Woodward stated that "I asked Nickie, 'What's the matter, babe?' and he couldn't put sentences together. I guess he didn't have the breath. He said, 'Wanna die. Wanna be with Dad. Too hard.'" She also quoted him as saying "Chest hurts bad". Contreraz's mother, Julie Vega, also later stated that during his final conversation he had with his family, he coughed uncontrollably. Despite what would seem to be the alarming nature of this conversation, for whatever reason no apparent attempt was made to make sure that he received reliable medical attention, nor was any such attempt apparently made after Contreraz spoke with Don Berg, his probation officer, two days later. The day before he died, he was quoted as saying "Lord, help me, I need help, I need help..."

== Death ==
On March 2, during physical training, Contreraz had fainted a number of times, with one staff member saying he deserved an Academy Award for faking. He was thrown to the ground, forced to do push-ups, and bounced off a wall. Another boy was ordered to push him around in a wheelbarrow while Contreraz was ordered to mimic the sound of an ambulance siren. Despite his condition, Contreraz continued to be accused by staff of faking his condition, and at around 5:30 pm, collapsed for the last time. According to witnesses later interviewed by Arizona Child Protective Services, after his final collapse and inability to move, Contreraz was ordered by staff to get up, to which he simply replied "No", which was his last spoken word. Contreraz was pronounced dead two hours later. He died that same evening from an infection that apparently had gone undiagnosed.

== Aftermath ==
An investigation by the Los Angeles Times uncovered that in five years almost a hundred complaints of abuse had been filed. There were reports that staff had hit a boy with a shovel, and that one boy was burned with hot water, and needed skin grafts.

The California Department of Economic Security issued a report the year of Contreraz's death and said there was a "pattern of abuse and neglect" at Arizona Boys Ranch, even while the authorities were investigating the institution, according to Linda Blessing, the agency's director. The institute was denied a new license, because of "multiple violations of state law and rules". Investigators from the DES said that there 32 instances of abuse or neglect pertaining to Contreraz, and that 17 different employees, including supervisors, had been guilty of them.

The Oracle facility is closed, but the Queen Creek facility is now in operation again, under the name Canyon State Academy.
