= Cleavon Gilman =

Emergency physician

- Born: 1978 or 1979 (age 45–46)
- Medical career
- Profession: Physician
- Field: Emergency medicine

Cleavon Gilman (born 1978 or 1979) is an emergency physician and public health advocate in the United States. He is also an Iraq war veteran having been a Navy Hospital Corpsman attached to the U.S. Marine Corps. He completed his residency training in New York City at the Presbyterian Hospital during the early part of the COVID-19 pandemic and subsequently moved to Yuma, Arizona in June 2020.

He has called on people not to ignore health recommendations and to decrease travel during the COVID-19 pandemic. He has also raised concern regarding the lack of a state wide mask requirement in Arizona and the lack of regulations regarding gyms. The president elect Joe Biden thanks him for his effort to educate the public in December 2020. In November of 2020, Yuma Regional Medical Center refused to let him work due to his efforts to educate the public on the seriousness of the pandemic.

== Yuma Regional Medical Center ==
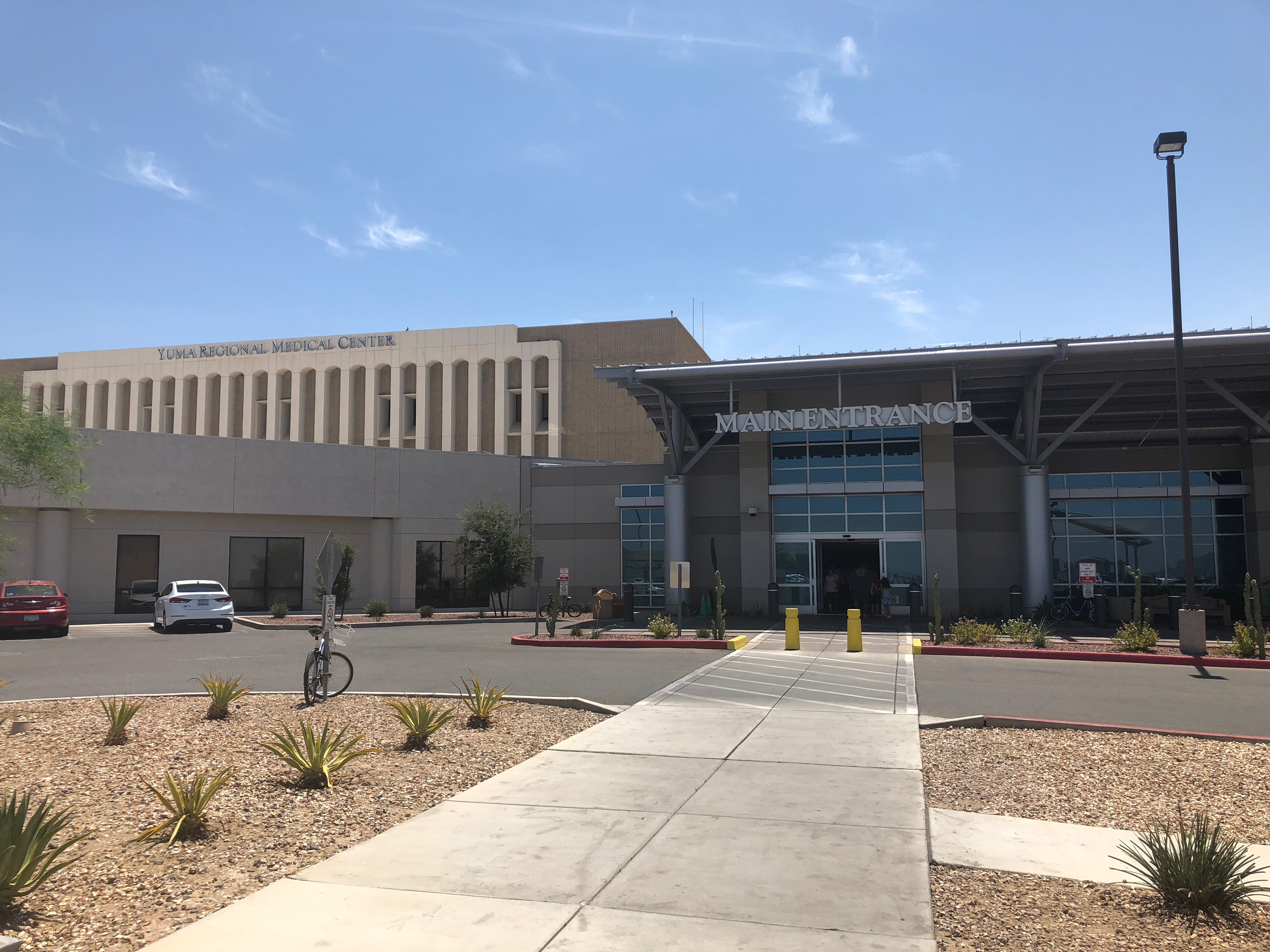
YRMC main entrance

He was not permitted to work at Yuma Regional Medical Center (YRMC) on November 23, 2020 due to posting on social media about the lack of ICU beds in the state of Arizona at the time. The wording of the tweet that he believes was of concern is "no more ICU beds in the state of Arizona." The governor of Arizona Doug Ducey at the time claimed that there was more than 100 ICU beds open.

The hospital did not speak to him directly but let him know through the company he works for, Envision Healthcare. He states that this has harmed him from a financial point of view. The hospital claims it has backed down and is permitting him to return to work, but as of December 10, 2020 Dr. Gilman states they had not spoken to him. A hospital spokesperson claimed it was a "misunderstanding". They also said that Dr. Gilman was not to speak out on social media.

== Personal life ==
As of 2020 he is engaged to be married and has two children. He has been personally affected by the opioid epidemic. One of his cousins has also died from COVID-19. He has a stutter and he was a keynote speaker at the National Stuttering Association's 2020 virtual conference.
