= Arizona Department of Health Services =

Government agency

Arizona Department of Health Services (ADHS) is a state agency of Arizona, headquartered in Phoenix. The agency provides health services to the state's population.

== Directors ==
- Will Humble (2009–2015)
- Dr. Cara Christ (2015–2021)
- Don Herrington (2021–2022)
- Jennifer Cunico (2022–2023)
- Dr. Theresa Cullen (2023)
- Jennifer Cunico (2023–2025)
- Sheila Sjolader (2025)
- Debbie Johnston (2025–Present)
