= Yu Dechao =

Chinese university professor (1964)

Yu Dechao (Chinese: 俞德超; born February 4, 1964), also known as Michael Yu, is the founder and CEO of the Chinese pharmaceutical company Innovent Biologics. He received a PhD degree in Genetics from the Chinese Academy of Sciences and completed post-doctoral training in pharmaceutical chemistry at the UCSF. As an inventor and owner of more than 60 patents (including 38 U.S. patents), Yu established Innovent Biologics in 2011. He is a professor and doctoral supervisor of Sichuan University, a visiting professor of Zhejiang University and an adjunct professor at Suzhou University, the chairman of the board of the Chinese Antibody Society.

== Biography ==
Yu was the vice president of Research and Development at Applied Genetic Technologies Corporation (Nasdaq: AGTC) and Calydon, Inc., the latter was acquired by Cell Genesys, Inc. in 2001, where he worked for three years following the acquisition. In 2011, Yu founded Innovent Biologics, and it became listed on the Main Board of the HKEX with the stock code: 01801.HK. on October 31, 2018.

== Achievements in biomedicine ==
Yu invented and developed three "Class I" drugs in China. He invented Oncorine (an oncology product), which is the world's first oncolytic virus product; Tyvyt (generic name: sintilimab), which is the domestically developed PD-1 antibody jointly developed by Innovent Biologics and Eli Lilly and Company, and the key clinical results of Tyvyt in patients with r/r cHL have been published by the Lancet Haematology. And Tyvyt has been officially approved by the National Medical Products Administration for marketing in China for relapsed or refractory classical Hodgkin's lymphoma (r/r cHL) as the first approved indication.

== Awards and recognition ==
Yu Dechao was selected as "Most Influential Overseas Returnee in Life Sciences" in 2013; one of the "Top Ten Figure of Innovation in China" in 2014; "E&Y Entrepreneur of the Year in China" in 2015; "Distinguished Entrepreneur of Jiangsu Province" in 2016; national "Person of the Year in Innovation for Science and Technology in 2016" in January 2017; awarded as "The Seventh National Overseas Returnee Contributions Awards" in 2018.
