= Innovent Biologics =

Chinese Biopharmaceutical Company

Innovent Biologics, Inc.

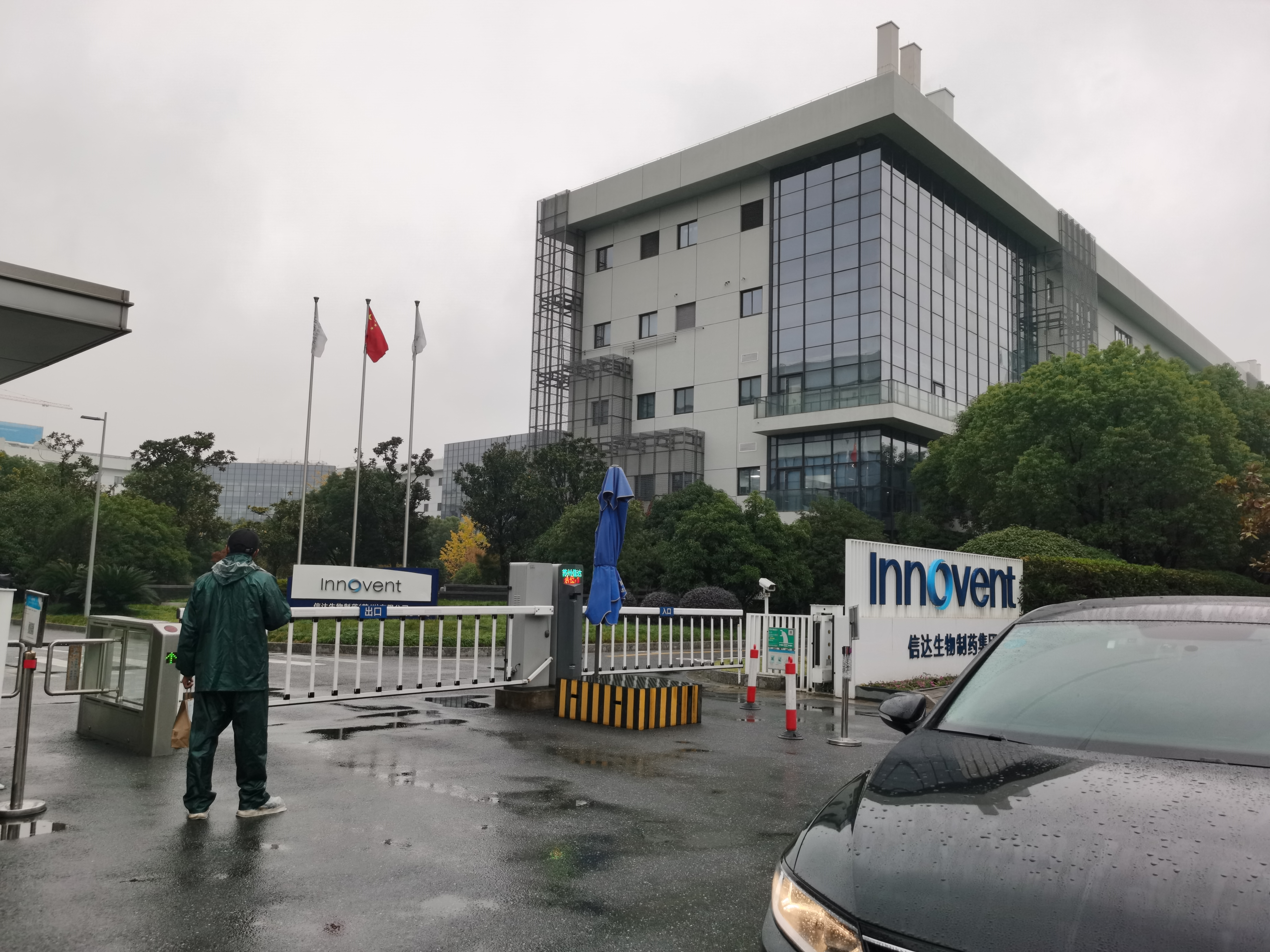
- Headquarters in Suzhou Industrial Park
- Native name: 信达生物制药（苏州）有限公司
- Company type: Public
- Traded as: SEHK: 1801
- Industry: Biopharmaceutical
- Founded: 28 November 2011; 14 years ago
- Founder: Yu Dechao
- Headquarters: Suzhou Industrial Park, Suzhou, Jiangsu, China
- Key people: Yu Dechao (Chairman & CEO)
- Revenue: ▲CN¥9.42 billion (2024)
- Net income: ▲CN¥−94.63 million (2024)
- Total assets: ▲CN¥21.60 billion (2024)
- Total equity: ▲CN¥13.12 billion (2024)
- Number of employees: 5,659 (2024)
- Website: www.innoventbio.com

Innovent Biologics, Inc. (Innovent; Chinese: 信达生物制药; pinyin: Xìndá shēngwù zhìyào) is a publicly listed Chinese biopharmaceutical company that is headquartered in Suzhou, Jiangsu.

== History ==
Innovent was founded in 2011 by Yu Dechao to focus on the development of a class of biotech drugs known as monoclonal antibodies. It received venture capital funding from Eli Lilly and Company and Fidelity Investments. Other investors included China Life, Hillhouse Capital and Temasek.

In March 2015, Innovent and Eli Lilly agreed to a deal that would pay $56 million upfront to Innovent to co-develop at least three experimental cancer drugs. Innovent would be paid more than $400 million if one of the Innovent drugs hit certain development and commercial goals.

In October 2018, Innovent held its initial public offering and became a listed company on the Hong Kong Stock Exchange. The offering raised $421 million.

In December 2018, Innovent's Sintilimab was approved in China. In 2020, Eli Lilly paid $200 million upfront and committed up to $825 million to gain ex-China rights to it. However, in December 2022, Eli Lilly terminated the deal due to Food and Drug Administration rejection.

In June 2025, Innovent's Mazdutide was approved in China. It was the first Chinese company to win regulatory approval to sell a GLP-1 drug for weight loss and diabetes. It partnered with JD Health to help distribute the drug.

In August 2025, Sanofi stated it would invest $307.88 million in Innovent to jointly develop two cancer drugs in China.

In October 2025, Takeda Pharmaceutical Company signed an $11.4 billion deal with Innovent to help accelerate the development of immuno-oncology and antibody-drug conjugate cancer therapies. The deal includes a $1.2 billion upfront payment from Takeda.

In November 2025, it was announced that Innovent would become a member of the Hang Seng Index.

== See also ==
- Novo Nordisk
- Merck & Co.
- Bristol Myers Squibb
