= David A. Ricks =

American businessman

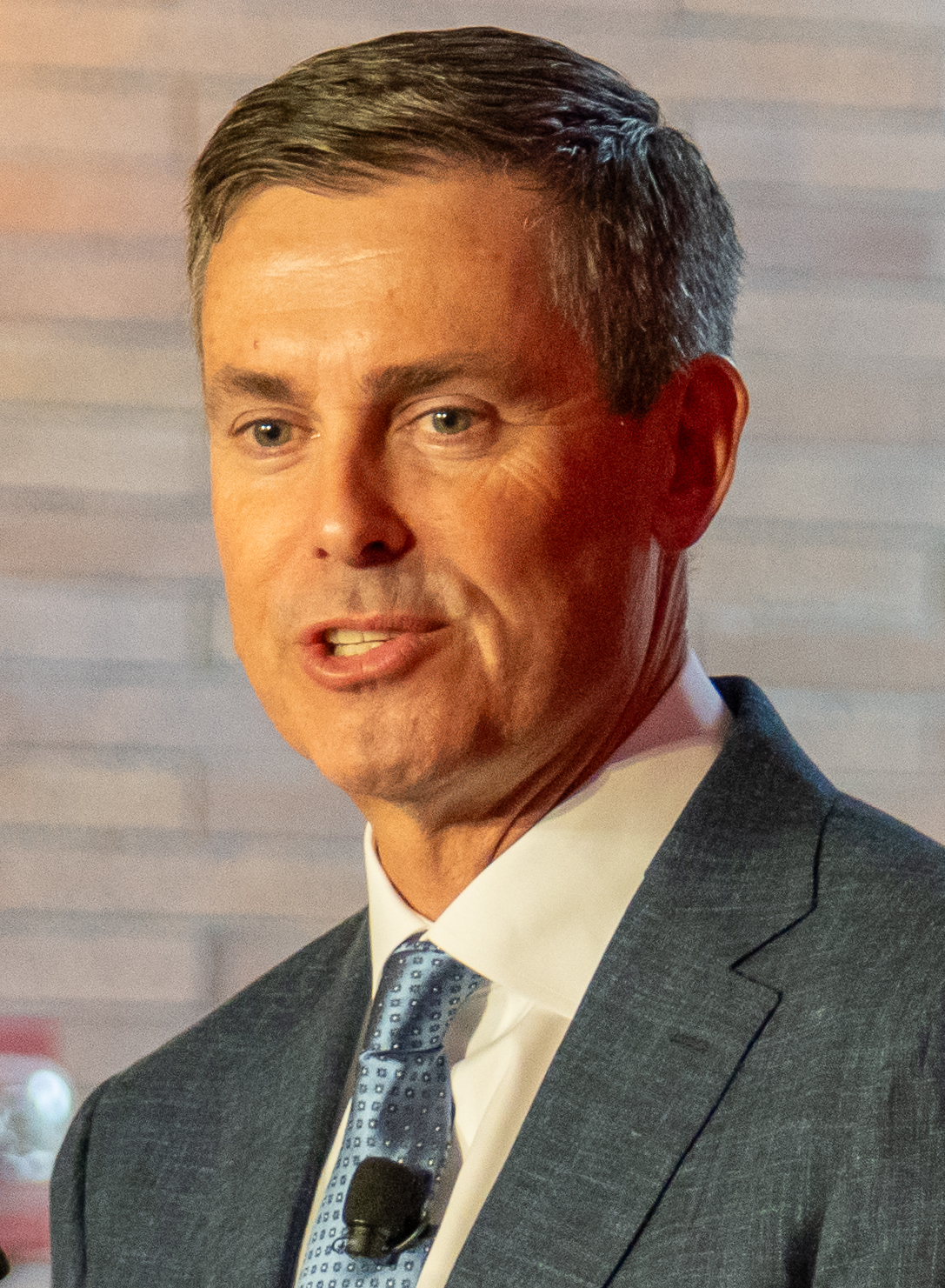
- Ricks in Virginia in 2025
- Born: 1967 (age 58–59); United States
- Education: Purdue University Indiana University
- Occupation: Businessman
- Known for: Chief executive officer of pharmaceutical company Eli Lilly and Company

David A. Ricks (born 1967) is an American businessman. He is currently the chair and chief executive officer of pharmaceutical company Eli Lilly and Company, assuming both roles in 2017. He is also a member of the board of directors of Adobe and the Purdue University Board of Trustees.

== Early life and education ==
Ricks was born in 1967 in Bloomington Indiana and graduated from Purdue University in 1990 with a Bachelor in Science, and earned a Master of Business Administration in 1996 from the Kelley School of Business, Indiana University.Ricks is a distinguished Eagle Scout and was awarded an honorary Doctorate in Pharmaceutical Management from Purdue University.

== Career ==
David A. Ricks is chair and chief executive officer of Eli Lilly and Company. He joined the company 30 years ago and has held roles in business development, marketing, country management and drug development. Dave became CEO in January 2017 and was elected chair of the company’s board of directors effective June 2017.

Dave joined Lilly in 1996 as a business development associate and held several management roles in U.S. marketing and sales before moving into international leadership positions. He led Lilly’s operations as general manager in Canada and China and then returned as president of Lilly USA, the company’s largest affiliate. In 2012, Dave was promoted to president of Lilly Bio-Medicines, then the company’s largest business unit, overseeing drug development and commercial operations in neuroscience, pain and immunology.

As CEO and chair of Eli Lilly and Company, Ricks had a salary package of $29.2 million for the year of 2024.

After Donald Trump announced planned tariffs on pharmaceutical companies, Ricks stated that he was "not so sure" that tariffs were needed and instead supported permanent lower tax rates in the United States, including 15% for business production, and an extension of the Tax Cuts and Jobs Act, a law that Trump signed during his first term.
