= Virbac =

French animal health company

- Type: S.A. (corporation)
- Traded as: Euronext: VIRP; CAC Mid 60
- ISIN: FR0000031577
- Industry: Animal Health Care
- Founded: 1968
- Founder: Pierre-Richard Dick
- Headquarters: Carros, France
- Number of locations: 36 subsidiaries
- Area served: More than 100 countries
- Key people: Paul Martingell
- Products: Antibiotics, vaccines, dermatology, antiparasitics, dental hygiene...
- Revenue: ▲1,465 M€ (2025)
- Number of employees: 6,400 (2025)
- Website: corporate.virbac.com

Virbac is a French company dedicated to animal health located in Carros, near Nice. It was founded in 1968 by veterinarian Pierre-Richard Dick.

The company is the world’s 6th largest veterinarian pharmaceutical group with a turnover of 1,465 million euros in 2025 (61% companion animal and 39% food producing animal). The company is a limited company with a board Euronext Paris stock exchange - compartiment A and is part of the reference index: SBF 120, and eligible SRD, PEA and PEA-PME.

== History ==
Virbac (acronym of virology and bacteriology) is a French company dedicated to animal health located in Carros, near Nice. It was founded in 1968 by veterinarian Pierre-Richard Dick. Since his death in 1992, his youngest daughter, Marie-Hélène Dick-Madelpuech, also a veterinary surgeon, has chaired the Board of Directors.

In 1985, Virbac was listed on the stock exchange.

In June 2025, Paul Martingell is announced as the new Chief Executive Officer of Virbac, effective September 2025, following the resignation of Sébastien Huron in September 2024. In the meantime, Habib Ramdani serves as interim CEO.

== Activities ==
The company has 6,400 employees and is now present in over 100 countries with 36 sales subsidiaries. Its production is located in 10 countries among which France, the US, Mexico, Brazil, Vietnam. It also has 10 research and development centers located in the United States, Mexico, Chile, Uruguay, France, Vietnam, Taiwan and Australia. It generates nearly 90% of its revenues outside France.

Its product range is designed to cover the main pathologies in companion animals and livestock: internal and external parasiticides (collars and pipettes), antibiotics, vaccines, diagnostic tests, dog and cat nutrition, dermatology, dental hygiene, reproductive, aquaculture, anesthesia, geriatrics and electronic identification (pets, horses, exotic pets…).
