= Sintilimab =

Medication to treat Hodgkin's disease

Monoclonal antibody
- Type: ?

Clinical data
- Other names: Anti-PD-1 monoclonal antibody IBI308
- ATC code: None

Identifiers
- CAS Number: 2072873-06-2
- UNII: 8FU7FQ8UPK
- KEGG: D12119

Sintilimab, sold under the brand Tyvyt among others, is a medication used to treat Hodgkin's disease, and has been approved in China.

It is a fully human IgG4 monoclonal antibody that binds to programmed cell death protein 1.

It was jointly developed by Innovent Biologics and Eli Lilly.

== Medical uses ==
Sintilimab is medication that is indicated for the treatment of relapsed or refractory classical Hodgkin's lymphoma after failure of at least second-line systemic chemotherapy.

== Side effects ==
Common side effects include fever, thyroid dysfunction, elevation of liver enzymes, and lung inflammation.

== Research ==
Currently, more than 20 clinical trials are ongoing to evaluate the anti-tumor effect of sintilimab injection, either as monotherapy or in combination with other agents, on a variety of solid tumors. In January 2019, the result of the registration trial of sintilimab in people with refractory or relapsed classical Hodgkin's lymphoma was published.
