= ICOSLG =

Protein-coding gene in the species Homo sapiens

Identifiers
- Aliases: ICOSLG, B7-H2, B7H2, B7RP-1, B7RP1, CD275, GL50, ICOS-L, ICOSL, LICOS, inducible T-cell co-stimulator ligand, inducible T-cell costimulator ligand, inducible T cell costimulator ligand, B7h
- External IDs: OMIM: 605717; MGI: 1354701; GeneCards: ICOSLG

Gene location (Human)
Chr.	Chromosome 21 (human)
Band	21q22.3	Start	44,217,014 bp
Band	21q22.3	End	44,240,966 bp

Gene location (Mouse)
Chr.	Chromosome 10 (mouse)
Band	10|10 C1	Start	77,905,136 bp
Band	10|10 C1	End	77,919,747 bp
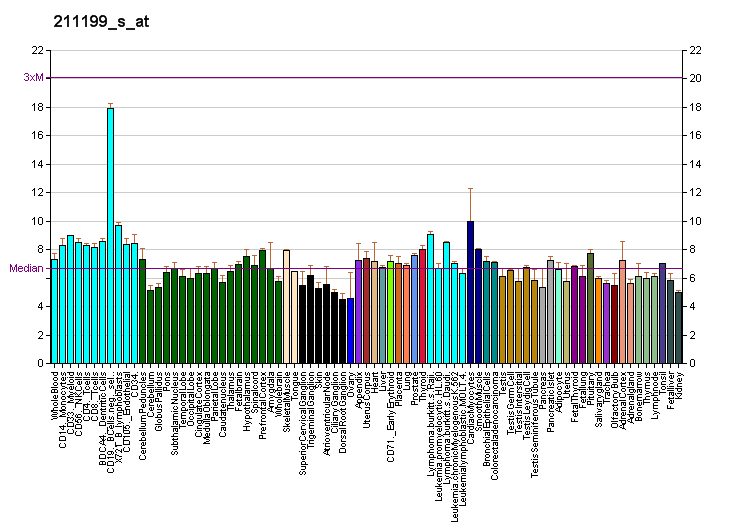
RNA expression pattern
Bgee	Human / Mouse (ortholog); Top expressed in: cartilage tissue; apex of heart; C1 segment; corpus callosum; putamen; bone marrow cell; substantia nigra; skin of limb; skin of leg; skin of abdomen / Top expressed in: granulocyte; zygote; mesenteric lymph nodes; spleen; secondary oocyte; cumulus cell; primary oocyte; blood; subcutaneous adipose tissue; submandibular gland; More reference expression data
BioGPS	More reference expression data
Gene ontology
Molecular function	signaling receptor binding; protein binding; identical protein binding
Cellular component	integral component of membrane; extracellular exosome; membrane; plasma membrane; external side of plasma membrane; cytoplasmic ribonucleoprotein granule
Biological process	B cell activation; defense response; T cell costimulation; adaptive immune response; hyperosmotic response; T cell activation; signal transduction; positive regulation of activated T cell proliferation; immune system process; regulation of immune response; T cell receptor signaling pathway
Sources:Amigo / QuickGO
Orthologs
Databases	NCBI: entry; OMA: entry
Species	Human	Mouse
Entrez	23308	50723
Ensembl	ENSG00000160223	ENSMUSG00000000732
UniProt	O75144	Q9JHJ8
RefSeq (mRNA)	NM_001283050; NM_001283051; NM_001283052; NM_015259; NM_001365759 NM_001395918	NM_015790
RefSeq (protein)	NP_001269979; NP_001269980; NP_001269981; NP_056074; NP_001352688	NP_056605
Location (UCSC)	Chr 21: 44.22 – 44.24 Mb	Chr 10: 77.91 – 77.92 Mb
PubMed search
- Wikidata
View/Edit Human	View/Edit Mouse

ICOS ligand is a protein that in humans is encoded by the ICOSLG gene located at chromosome 21. ICOSLG has also been designated as CD275 (cluster of differentiation 275).

ICOSLG is glycosylated transmembrane structure, which is classified as a member of the B7 family due to the significant homology with B7 family members. The B7/CD28 superfamily provides both positive and negative co-signals to immunocytes in immune responses.

The interaction of ICOSLG with ICOS, the specific receptor for ICOSLG, is critically involved in the activation, proliferation, differentiation and cytokine production of T cells as well as in the antibody secretion from B cells during secondary immune responses.

ICOSLG, which is extensively expressed in both non-lymphatic and lymphatic tissues, is an important molecule in upregulating and promoting T cell immune responses. Expression of ICOSLG in naive B cells and monocytes in PBMCs is at a low level. After stimulation by IFN-γ, TNF-α, or LPS, it can be quickly up-regulated. The induced expression of ICOS on activated T cells mainly regulates the secretion of Th2 cytokines and thus shifts the immune response to the Th2 type. It has been reported that the ICOS/ICOSLG pathway is involved in immunopathogenesis such as infection, hypersensitivity, autoimmune diseases, transplantation immunity and tumor immunity.

ICOSLG is also a major costimulator in endothelial cell-mediated T cell activation. It has an important physiological role of ICOSLG in the reactivation of effector/memory T cells on the endothelium controlling the entry of immune cells into inflamed tissue.

== Structure ==
Inducible costimulator-ligand (ICOS-L) is a member of the B7 family of costimulatory ligands sharing 19–20% sequence identity with CD80 and CD86. Two splice variants of human ICOSLG have been described and designated hICOSLG and B7-H2/B7RP-1/hLICOS.

Both molecules have an identical extracellular domain but differ at the carboxyl-terminal end of their cytoplasmic regions. In humans, cell surface expression of ICOSLG has been described on B cells, dendritic cells, monocytes/macrophages, and T cells. In addition, mRNA expression of ICOSLG has been detected in a variety of lymphoid and nonlymphoid organs, with hICOSLG showing a more lymphoid-restricted expression pattern (spleen, lymph node), whereas B7-H2/B7RP-1/hLICOSmRNA was expressed in all organs examined (e.g., spleen, kidney, heart, and brain).

== Interaction ==
Murine ICOSLG, unlike CD80 and CD86, does not interact with CD28 or CTLA-4 (CD152). Instead, ICOSLG binds to ICOS, a T cell-specific costimulatory molecule homologous to CD28 and CTLA-4. In humans, ICOSLG binds to ICOS but also to CD28 and CTLA-4.

The strong impact of ICOS/ICOSLG interaction on T cell-mediated immune responses in vivo became evident by the disruption of the ICOS gene in mice. ICOS deficient mice are characterized by impaired germinal center formation, have a profound defect in isotype class switching in T cell-dependent B cell responses, and are defective in IL-4 and IL-13 production. In addition, blockade of ICOS/ICOSLG interaction in animal models of experimental allergic encephalomyelitis and of cardiac allograft rejection revealed a critical role of ICOS and its ligand in inflammatory immune reactions.

== Immunodeficiencies ==
The research with mutant ICOSLG showed that if the protein was retained in ER/GA, instead of the cell surface in normal case, it diminished B cell costimulation of T cells. It led to defect in antibody and memory B cell generation. Mutant ICOSLG also impaired migration of lymphocytes and neutrophils across endothelial cells, which normally express ICOSLG. These defects contributed with altered adaptive immunity and neutropenia in patient, thus showing ICOSLG deficiency as a cause of combined immunodeficiency.

== Immunotherapy ==
The fluctuant balance between co-stimulatory and coinhibitory signals that a T cell receives participates in the initiation, effection, and termination of an immune response. Excessive activation and immune reaction of T cells may result in autoimmune diseases and host immune injury.

ICOSLG delivers a potent co-stimulatory signal to T cells when engaged by ICOS, resulting in T cell activation and proliferation. The existence of ICOS/ICOSLG signal in vivo is closely associated with many mouse autoimmune disease models. Conversely, the absence of ICOS/ICOSLG signal may be a good way to relieve autoimmune disease. In view of its critical function in regulating immunohomeostasis, ICOS signaling has aroused great attention in immunodiagnosis and therapy.

The ICOS/ICOSLG axis has been shown to promote either antitumor T cell responses (when activated in Th1 and other Teff) or protumor responses when triggered in Tregs. Therefore, both agonistic and antagonistic monoclonal antibodies (mAbs) targeting this pathway are being investigated for cancer immunotherapy. Stimulation of the ICOS pathway by tumor cell vaccine expressing ICOSLG, in combination with anti-CTLA-4 therapy blockade, led to enhanced antitumor efficacy. This combined treatment approach, which integrates ICOS costimulation through ICOSLG and CTLA-4 blockade, effectively alters tumor-associated macrophages (TAMs) towards a phenotype that fights against tumors, showing significant promise for cancer treatment.

Undoubtedly, the development of more efficient and specific monoclonal antibodies may be important for further disclosure of ICOSLG function. Agonistic Abs are currently being administered either alone or in combination with immunotherapy and chemotherapy.
