= Jeffrey Bluestone =

American scientist and academic

Jeffrey A. Bluestone
- Born: 1953 (age 72–73)
- Education: Rutgers State University, Cornell Graduate School of Medical Science
- Known for: T cell activation and immune tolerance in autoimmunity, organ transplantation, and cancer
- Scientific career
- Fields: Immunology
- Institutions: University of California, San Francisco
- Doctoral advisor: Carlos Lopez
- Other academic advisors: David Sachs
- Website: bluestonelab.ucsf.edu

Jeffrey Allen Bluestone (born in 1953) is an American researcher who is the A.W. and Mary Margaret Clausen Distinguished Professor Emeritus of Metabolism and Endocrinology at the University of California, San Francisco, and was previously executive vice chancellor and provost of that university. He began the UCSF affiliation in 2000, after earlier positions at the NCI-NIH, and at The University of Chicago.

His research is focused on understanding T cell activation and immune tolerance in autoimmunity and organ transplantation. In April 2016, he co-founded and served as the president and CEO of the Parker Institute for Cancer Immunotherapy,. In 2019, he co-founded and is Chief Executive Officer and President of Sonoma Biotherapeutics.

== Early life and education ==
Jeffrey A. Bluestone was born in 1953 in Ft. Sill, OK. Bluestone earned his undergraduate and masters degrees in microbiology from Rutgers State University, and his doctoral degree in immunology from Cornell Graduate School of Medical Science.

== Career ==
Bluestone started his career in a series of positions at the National Cancer Institute, a part of the National Institutes of Health, where he rose over a period of 7 years to become a senior investigator in the NCI's Immunology Branch. He then took a position at The University of Chicago as a member of the Ben May Institute for Cancer Research, and as an associate professor (in pathology). Over 13 years—from 1987 to 2000—he rose to become chairman of the University's Committee on Immunology, and director of that institute, a role he served in from 1995 to 2000.

In 2000, he moved to the University of California, San Francisco, to direct the UCSF Diabetes Center and metabolic research unit. Beginning at least 2011, Bluestone headed the Immune Tolerance Network, a consortium of over 1000 scientists to focus efforts on the development of immune tolerance therapies, a position that as of January 2022 he listed as a previous one at his UCSF profile. At one time, he was in leadership at the Brehm Coalition; as of January 2022 he was listed as an emeritus member there.

Bluestone became UCSF's interim vice chancellor of research in 2008. In 2009, the efforts of a UCSF committee led by Bluestone made that university a leading institutional recipient of science-directed funds available to universities from the American Recovery and Reinvestment Act. He became executive vice chancellor and provost of UCSF in 2010, a position he held until 2015. As provost, as of 2011 he had set up collaborations with Pfizer, Sanofi-Aventis, and Bayer, as well as many other UCSF-industry collaborations.

As of January 2022, Bluestone is the A.W. and Mary Margaret Clausen Distinguished Professor of Metabolism and Endocrinology, and the director of the Hormone Research Institute in the Diabetes Center at UCSF. (He is a previous director of the Diabetes Center, per se.) As of April 2016, he was serving as the president and CEO of the Parker Institute for Cancer Immunotherapy.

Since this date, Bluestone has been a member of the editorial board for Immunity.

== Research ==
As of January 2022, Bluestone's research group focuses on studying the role of T cell receptors on regulatory T cells ("Tregs"). In the early 90s, he identified the role of CD28 and its interaction with CTLA-4 The development of soluble receptors of CTLA-4 led to the development of the drugs abatacept and later belatacept. Further work with James P. Allison to target CTLA-4 resulted in the development of immune checkpoint therapies also known as immunotherapy. This led to the clinical development of ipilimumab (Yervoy™), which was approved in 2011 by the FDA for the treatment of metastatic melanoma. Their current work on understanding Tregs has been discussed as an avenue to further developments in the treatment Type 1 Diabetes.

== Awards and recognition ==
Bluestone was elected as a fellow to the American Academy of Arts and Sciences in 2006, and as a member of the National Academy of Medicine.. In 2023, he was elected to the National Academy of Sciences.

He has received the Mary Tyler Moore and Robert Levine Excellence in Clinical Research Award from the Juvenile Diabetes Research Foundation, and an award for distinguished alumni from his doctoral institution.
