= Co-stimulation =

Signal to activate immune cells

Co-stimulation is a secondary signal which immune cells rely on to activate an immune response in the presence of an antigen-presenting cell. In the case of T cells, two stimuli are required to fully activate their immune response. During the activation of lymphocytes, co-stimulation is often crucial to the development of an effective immune response. Co-stimulation is required in addition to the antigen-specific signal from their antigen receptors.

== T cell co-stimulation ==
T cells require two signals to become fully activated. A first signal, which is antigen-specific, is provided through the T cell receptor (TCR) which interacts with peptide-MHC molecules on the membrane of an antigen presenting cell (APC). A second signal, the co-stimulatory signal, is antigen nonspecific and is provided by the interaction between co-stimulatory molecules expressed on the membrane of the APC and the T cell. This interaction promotes and enhances the TCR signaling, but can also be bi-directional. The co-stimulatory signal is necessary for T cell proliferation, differentiation and survival. Activation of T cells without co-stimulation may lead to the unresponsiveness of the T cell (also called anergy), apoptosis or the acquisition of the immune tolerance.

The counterpart of the co-stimulatory signal is a (co-)inhibitory signal, where inhibitory molecules interact with different signaling pathways in order to arrest T cell activation. Mostly known inhibitory molecules are CTLA4 and PD1, used in cancer immunotherapy.

In T cell biology there are several co-stimulatory molecules from different protein families. Mostly studied are those belonging to Immunoglobulin super-family (IgSF) (such as CD28, B7, ICOS, CD226 or CRTAM) and TNF receptor super-family (TNFRSF) (such as 41-BB, OX40, CD27, GITR, HVEM, CD40, BAFFR, BAFF and others). Additionally, some co-stimulatory molecules belong to TIM family, CD2/SLAM family or BTN/BTN-like family.

The surface expression of different co-stimulatory molecules is regulated on a transcriptional and post-transcriptional level, but also by endocytosis. The dynamics of the receptor expression usually depends on the cell state. Some molecules are permanently expressed on non-stimulated cells, such as CD28, others only after TCR triggering, for example 41-BB or CD27.

=== Mechanism of function ===
Generally, the mechanism of function of co-stimulatory molecules is based on the overlap of their signaling pathway with the primary (TCR) signal and the induction of other, distal pathways often using different routes, leading to the enhancement of TCR signal and expression of effector genes. Additionally, co-stimulatory signaling can also have a unique outcome.

The example of IgSF molecule is one of the most important co-stimulatory molecules expressed on T cells, CD28, which interacts predominantly with CD80 (B7.1) and CD86 (B7.2), but also with B7-H2 (ICOS-L) in humans, present on the membrane of activated APCs. It is constitutively localized, among other important T cell signaling molecules, in the central SMAC (supramolecular activation complex) of the immunological synapse. Its signaling is involved in the recruitment of protein kinase C θ (PKCθ), Ras GEF and Ras GRP to the synapse. Moreover, it induces the activity of NFAT and NFκB transcription factors through interaction with lymphocyte cell-specific protein-tyrosine kinase (LCK) and GRB2 and/or activation of phopshoinositol-3-Kinase (PI3K) resulting in Akt kinase activation, promoting T cell proliferation and IL-2 production. Additionally, it's involved in other biochemical functions of the cell, including T cell metabolism, post-translational protein modifications or cytoskeletal remodeling.

Another costimulatory receptor expressed on T cells is ICOS ( Inducible Costimulator), which interacts with ICOS-L expressed mainly on the APCs. This receptor is genetically closely related to CD28 but cannot substitute for its function. Among many similarities with CD28, it also induces Akt activity through PI3K activation and promotes proliferation. However, there are differences in these pathways, which contribute to the disparity between CD28 and ICOS signaling.

Signaling through co-stimulatory molecules from TNFRSF often involves the interaction with TRAF adaptor proteins to enhance T cell stimulation. For instance, 41-BB (CD137; TNFRSF9) is a signaling molecule expressed mainly on T cells, but also on NK cells. Due to extracellular galectin 9 binding, 41-BB complexes are kept preassembled on the membrane. It interacts with TRAF1 and TRAF2 adaptor proteins, which are involved in pathway eventually leading to NFκB translocation to the nucleus, as well as MAPK/ERK pathway.

OX40 (CD134; TNFRSF4) is another co-stimulatory molecule expressed after T cell activation, but in the later timepoints, since it inhibits apoptosis and increases survival rate several days after the stimulation.

=== Co-stimulation in different T cell types ===
CD28 is important practically for all T cell types, but some other co-stimulatory molecules are expressed in some cell types more than in others.

CD2 was shown to prime naive T cells (T_{N}) even without CD28 or TCR. Also, CD27 is a receptor constitutively expressed on T_{N} (its expression is downregulated upon TCR stimulation) and enhances T cell proliferation.

The differentiation of T helper cells (T_{H}) into different subsets also partially depends on their co-stimulatory molecules. TIM1, TIM4, ICOS, CD3 or DR3 and several molecules from the SLAM family were shown to induce polarization towards T_{H}2. In contrast, CD27 and HVEM promote T_{H}1 polarization. OX40 and ICOS expression was linked to T folicular helper (T_{FH}) differentiation and maintenance. Regulatory T cells (T_{REG}) need CD28 signal for their generation and ICOS signal for their peripheral maintenance and survival. In contrast, HVEM, GITR and CD30 are suppressing their activity.

Effector T cells are mainly regulated by TNFRSF molecules, such as 41-BB, CD27, OX40, DR3 or GITR, which enhance their proliferation and survival.

Memory T cells T_{M} were also shown to necessitate co-stimulatory signals. Apart from CD28; ICOS, 41-BB, OX40, TIM3, CD30, BTLA or CD27 were also shown to play role in the proper formation and later signaling of T_{M}.

== B cell co-stimulation ==
B cell binds antigens with its BCR (a membrane-bound antibody), which transfers intracellular signals to the B cell as well as inducing the B cell to engulf the antigen, process it, and present it on the MHC II molecules. The latter case induces recognition by antigen-specific Th2 cells or Tfh cells, leading to activation of the B cell through binding of TCR to the MHC-antigen complex. It is followed by synthesis and presentation of CD40L (CD154) on the Th2 cell, which binds to CD40 on the B cell, thus the Th2 cell can co-stimulate the B cell. Without this co-stimulation the B cell cannot proliferate further.

Co-stimulation for B cells is provided alternatively by complement receptors. Microbes may activate the complement system directly and complement component C3b bind to microbes. After C3b is degraded into a fragment iC3b (inactive derivative of C3b), then cleaved to C3dg, and finally to C3d, which continue to bind to microbial surface, B cells express complement receptor CR2 (CD21) to bind to iC3b, C3dg, or C3d. This additional binding makes the B cells 100- to 10,000-fold more sensitive to antigen. CR2 on mature B cells forms a complex with CD19 and CD81. This complex is called the B cell coreceptor complex for such sensitivity enhancement to the antigen.

== Applications ==
Abatacept (Orencia) is a T cell co-stimulation modulator approved for the treatment of rheumatoid arthritis. The cytokines secreted by activated T cells are thought to both initiate and propagate the immunologically driven inflammation associated with rheumatoid arthritis. Orencia, a soluble fusion protein, works by altering the co-stimulatory signal required for full T-cell activation. Belatacept is another novel molecule which is being tested as an anti-rejection medication for use in renal transplantation.

A new co-stimulatory superagonistic drug, TGN1412, was the subject of a clinical trial at Northwick Park Hospital, London. The trial became surrounded in controversy as the six volunteers became seriously ill within minutes of being given the drug.

In essence, the co-stimulatory molecules function as "flashing red lights" that interact with the T cell, communicating that the material being presented by the dendritic cell material indicates danger. Dendritic cells displaying co-stimulatory molecules while presenting antigen are able to activate T cells. In contrast, T cells that recognize antigen presented by a dendritic cell not displaying co-stimulatory molecules are generally driven to apoptosis, or may become unresponsive to future encounters with the antigen.
