= AITR =

AITR may refer to:

- Activation-Inducible TNFR family Receptor, also known as TNFRSF18
- Acropolis Institute of Technology and Research
- The Academy of Information Technology and Robotics at Spruce Creek High School
- Annual Income Tax Return
