= Immunologic checkpoint =

An immune checkpoint regulator is a modulator of the immune system, that allows initiation of a productive immune response and prevents the onset of autoimmunity. Examples of such a molecule are cytotoxic T-lymphocyte antigen 4 (CTLA-4 or CD152), which is an inhibitory receptor found on immune cells and programmed cell death 1 (CD279), which has an important role in down-regulating the immune system by preventing the activation of T-cells.

Tumours involve certain immune-checkpoint pathways as a major mechanism of immune resistance, particularly against T cells that are specific for tumor antigens. Therefore, the strategy in using immunological checkpoints in cancer therapy is to inhibit inhibitory molecules of the immune system, thus stimulating the immune system. The ability to interfere with the inhibitory function of checkpoint receptors CD152 and CD279 (programmed death-1) in oncology has proved successful. In metastatic melanoma FDA approved an αCD152 monoclonal antibody Ipilimumab, that was found to prolong survival. In melanoma, nonsmall cell lung cancer, and renal cell carcinoma there is hope with CD279 blocking Ab, that promotes antitumor responses. In hematologic malignancies a humanized αCD279 IgG1 needs further research. In solid tumors the use of CD279 IgG4 Ab is promising, and further CD273/PD-L2 in stage IV.

In autoimmune rheumatic diseases, impaired tolerance leads to the development of diseases such as rheumatoid arthritis, systemic sclerosis, systemic lupus erythematosus, Sjogren’s syndrome, etc. Therefore, in autoimmune diseases the converse strategy of engaging immunological checkpoints may be beneficial: stimulate inhibitory molecules of the immune system, thus inhibiting the immune system (therefore, increase self-tolerance). What is known to work is Abatacept, an CD152-Ig used in treating rheumatoid arthritis and juvenile idiopathic arthritis.

Not studied enough yet are the therapeutic opportunities using Programmed death-1 pathway.
