= Type 1 regulatory T cell =

Type 1 regulatory cells or Tr1 (T_{R}1) cells are a class of regulatory T cells participating in peripheral immunity as a subset of CD4+ T cells. Tr1 cells regulate tolerance towards antigens of any origin. Tr1 cells are self or non-self antigen specific and their key role is to induce and maintain peripheral tolerance and suppress tissue inflammation in autoimmunity and graft vs. host disease.

== Characterization and surface molecules ==
The specific cell-surface markers for Tr1 cells in humans and mice are CD4^{+} CD49b^{+}LAG-3^{+} CD226^{+} from which LAG-3^{+} and CD49b^{+} are indispensable. LAG-3 is a membrane protein on Tr1 cells that negatively regulates TCR-mediated signal transduction in cells. LAG-3 activates dendritic cells (DCs) and enhances the antigen-specific T-cell response which is necessary for Tr1 cells antigen specificity. CD49b belongs to the integrin family and is a receptor for many (extracellular) matrix and non-matrix molecules. CD49b provides only little contribution to the differentiation and function of Tr1 cells.

They characteristically produce high levels of IL-10, IFN-γ, IL-5 and also TGF- β but neither IL-4 nor IL-2. Production of IL-10 is also much more rapid than its production by other T-helper cell types.

Tr1 cells do not constitutively express FOXP3 but only transiently, upon their activation and in smaller amounts than CD25^{+} FOXP3^{+} regulatory cells. FOXP3 is not required for Tr1 induction, nor for its function. They also express repressor of GATA-3 (ROG), while CD25^{+} FOXP3^{+} regulatory cells do not. ROG then downregulates GATA-3, a characteristic transcription factor for Th2 cells.

Tr1 cells express high levels of regulatory factors, such as glucocorticoid-induced tumor necrosis factor receptor (GITR), OX40 (CD134), and tumor-necrosis factor receptor (TNFRSF9). Resting human Tr1 cells express Th1 associated chemokine receptors CXCR3 and CCR5, and Th2-associated CCR3, CCR4 and CCR8. Upon activation, Tr1 cells migrate preferentially in response to I-309, a ligand for CCR8.

== Mechanism of Tr1-mediated suppression ==
The suppressing and tolerance-inducing effect of Tr1 cells is mediated mainly by cytokines. The other mechanism as cell to cell contact, modulation of dendritic cells, metabolic disruption and cytolysis is however also available to them. In vivo Tr1 cells need to be activated, to be able to exert their regulatory effects.

=== Mechanisms of suppression ===
- Cytokines mediated

Tr1 cells secrete large amount of suppressing cytokines IL-10 and TGF-β. IL-10 directly inhibits T cells by blocking its production of IL-2, IFN-γ and GM-CSF and have tolerogenic effect on B cells and support differentiation of other regulatory T cells. IL-10 indirectly downregulates MHC II molecules and co-stimulatory molecules on antigen-presenting cells (APC) and force them to upregulate tolerogenic molecules such as ILT-3, ILT-4 and HLA-G.

- Cell to cell contact:

Type 1 regulatory T cells poses inhibitory receptor CTLA-4 through which they exert suppressor function.

- Metabolic disruption:

Tr1 cells can express ectoenzymes CD39 and CD73 and are suspected of generating adenosine which suppresses effector T cell proliferation and their cytokine production in vitro.

- Cytolitic activity:

Tr1 cells can both express Granzyme A and granzyme B. It was shown recently, that Tr1 cells, in vitro and also ex vivo, specifically lyse cells of myeloid origin, but not other APC or T or B lymphocytes. Cytolysis indirectly suppresses immune response by reducing numbers of myeloid-origin antigen presenting cells.

== Differentiation ==
Tr 1 cells are inducible, arising from precursors naive T cells. They can be differentiated ex vivo and in vivo. The ways of Tr1 cells induction in vivo, ex vivo and in vitro differ and also envelop many different approaches but the molecular mechanism appears to be conserved.

IL-27, together with TGF-β induces IL-10–producing regulatory T cells with Tr1-like properties cells. IL-27 alone can induce IL-10-producing Tr1 cells, but in the absence of TGF-β, the cells produce large quantities of both IFN-γ and IL-10. IL-6 and IL-21 also plays a role in differentiation as they regulate expression of transcription factors necessary for IL-10 production, which is believed to start up the differentiation itself later on.

Proposed transcription biomarkers for type 1 regulatory cells differentiation are:

- musculoaponeurotic fibrosarcoma(c-Maf)
- the aryl hydrocarbon receptor (AhR)
- interferon regulatory factor 4 (IRF4)
- the repressor of GATA-3 (ROG)
- early growth response protein 2 (Egr-2)

Expression of these transcriptional factors are driven by IL-6 in IL-21 and IL-2 dependant manner.

== Clinical manifestation and application ==
Tr1 cells possess huge clinical potential in means to prevent, block and even cure several T cells mediated diseases, including GvHD, allograft rejection, autoimmunity and chronic inflammatory diseases. The first successful tests were performed on mouse models and on humans as well.

Transplantation research has shown, that donor Tr1 in response to recipient alloantigens, was found to correlate with the absence of GvHD after bone marrow transplantation, while decreased numbers of Tr1 markedly associated with severe GvHD. Decreased levels of IL-10 CD4+ producing cells were also observed in inflamed synovium and peripheral blood of patients with rheumatoid arthritis.

Phase I/II of clinical trials of Tr1 cell treatment concerning Crohn's disease have been successful and appear to be safe and do not lead to a general immune suppression.
