= LRRC23 =

Identifiers
- Aliases: LRRC23, LRPB7, leucine rich repeat containing 23
- External IDs: MGI: 1315192; HomoloGene: 5082; GeneCards: LRRC23; OMA:LRRC23 - orthologs

Gene location (Human)
| Chr. | Chromosome 12 (human) |
| Band | 12p13.31 | Start | 6,873,569 bp |
| Band | 12p13.31 | End | 6,914,241 bp |

Gene location (Mouse)
| Chr. | Chromosome 6 (mouse) |
| Band | 6 F2|6 59.17 cM | Start | 124,746,826 bp |
| Band | 6 F2|6 59.17 cM | End | 124,756,690 bp |
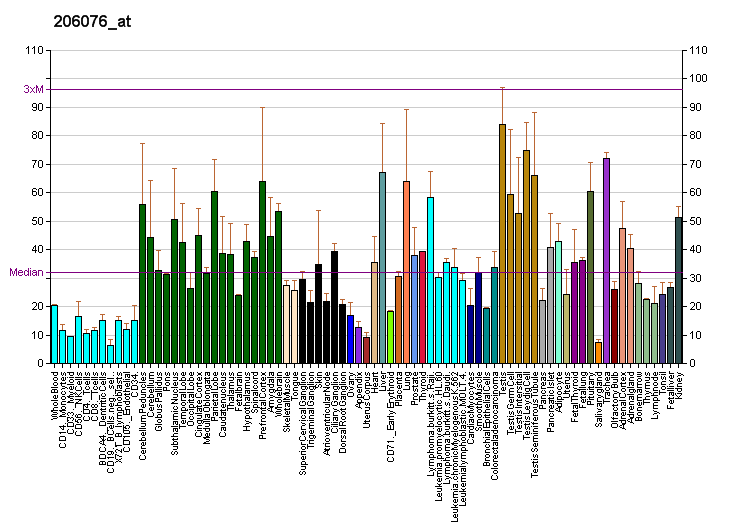
RNA expression pattern
| Bgee | Human / Mouse (ortholog); Top expressed in: right uterine tube; bronchial epithelial cell; olfactory zone of nasal mucosa; left testis; nasal epithelium; right testis; mucosa of paranasal sinus; caudate nucleus; sural nerve; nucleus accumbens / Top expressed in: spermatocyte; spermatid; seminiferous tubule; left lung lobe; right lung lobe; olfactory epithelium; choroid plexus of fourth ventricle; morula; Epithelium of choroid plexus; neural layer of retina; More reference expression data |
| BioGPS | More reference expression data |
Gene ontology
| Molecular function | molecular function |
| Cellular component | cellular component; cytoplasm; cytosol |
| Biological process | biological process |
Sources:Amigo / QuickGO
Orthologs
| Species | Human | Mouse |
| Entrez | 10233 | 16977 |
| Ensembl | ENSG00000010626 | ENSMUSG00000030125 |
| UniProt | Q53EV4 | O35125 |
| RefSeq (mRNA) | NM_201650; NM_001135217; NM_006992; NM_181613 | NM_013588; NM_001302555 |
| RefSeq (protein) | NP_001128689; NP_008923; NP_964013 | NP_001289484 |
| Location (UCSC) | Chr 12: 6.87 – 6.91 Mb | Chr 6: 124.75 – 124.76 Mb |
| PubMed search |
- Wikidata
| View/Edit Human | View/Edit Mouse |

Leucine-rich repeat-containing protein 23 is a protein that in humans is encoded by the LRRC23 gene.

== Function ==
The function of LRRC23 is unknown. It is a member of the leucine-rich repeat family of proteins, which are known for participating in protein-protein interactions. Experimental evidence suggests that LRRC23 interacts with the CD28 protein in a pathway related to the immune system and development of regulatory T cells that control spontaneous autoimmune disease.

== Protein sequence ==
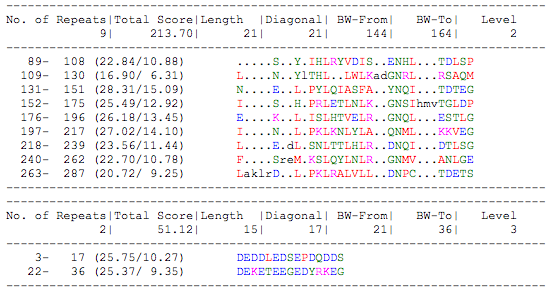
LRRC23 spans 343 residues containing two varieties of internally repeating sequence. Detected and aligned by RADAR, the most abundant repeat is the leucine-rich repeat, repeating 9 times in bases 89-287. The other repeated sequence occurs twice in bases 3-36. The RADAR program output, below, summarizes the composition and location of all the repeats and aligns them for comparison against each other.

The human genome produces three known variants of LRRC23. The largest splice variant, variant 3, contains 8 exons. Variants 1 and 2 use alternative first exons, and variant 2 excludes the seventh exon, giving it a total of seven exons making up the mRNA.

== Protein structure ==
Although the actual structure of LRRC23 is unknown, comparison to the crystal structures of various similar proteins such as 2OMW A (e-value 1.00e-17) reveals a structure typical of other leucine-rich repeat proteins. Alternating beta sheets and coils create a spiraled peptide chain forming an arch shape with beta-sheets occupying the concave surface.

The aligned structure of 2OMW_A with LRRC23 spans acids 72-272 of the LRRC23 protein. Conserved asparagines are highlighted in yellow, showing the regularity of spacing and repeat structure within. This model was generated using Cn3D software provided by NCBI.

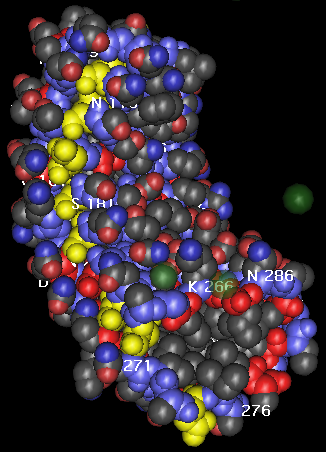
