= CD80 =

Mammalian protein found in humans

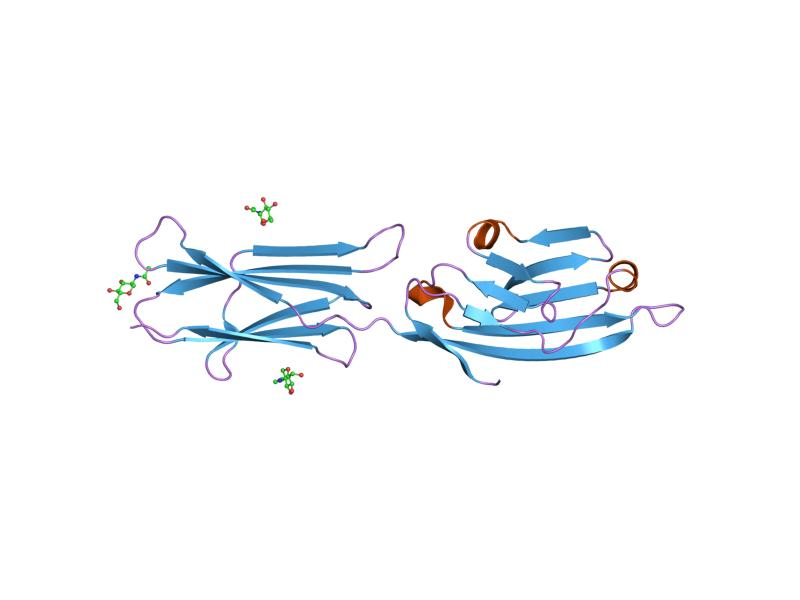

Identifiers
- Aliases: CD80, B7, B7-1, B7.1, BB1, CD28LG, CD28LG1, LAB7, CD80 molecule
- External IDs: OMIM: 112203; MGI: 101775; GeneCards: CD80
Available structures
PDB	Ortholog search: PDBe RCSB
PDB	List of PDB id codes 1DR9, 1I8L

Gene location (Human)
Chr.	Chromosome 3 (human)
Band	3q13.33	Start	119,524,293 bp
Band	3q13.33	End	119,559,614 bp

Gene location (Mouse)
Chr.	Chromosome 16 (mouse)
Band	16 B4|16 26.86 cM	Start	38,275,923 bp
Band	16 B4|16 26.86 cM	End	38,316,697 bp
RNA expression pattern
Bgee	Human / Mouse (ortholog); Top expressed in: testicle; lower lobe of lung; pancreatic ductal cell; tibialis anterior muscle; appendix; lymph node; spleen; upper lobe of lung; upper lobe of left lung; mucosa of ileum / Top expressed in: granulocyte; stroma of bone marrow; embryo; thymus; sternocleidomastoid muscle; spleen; vastus lateralis muscle; blood; endothelial cell of lymphatic vessel; major salivary gland; More reference expression data
BioGPS	n/a
Gene ontology
Molecular function	coreceptor activity; virus receptor activity; protein binding; phosphatidylinositol-4,5-bisphosphate 3-kinase activity
Cellular component	membrane; cell surface; external side of plasma membrane; integral component of membrane; plasma membrane; intracellular anatomical structure; protein complex involved in cell adhesion
Biological process	T cell costimulation; intracellular signal transduction; positive regulation of alpha-beta T cell proliferation; cell-cell signaling; positive regulation of signal transduction; cellular response to lipopolysaccharide; positive regulation of T-helper 1 cell differentiation; viral process; viral entry into host cell; positive regulation of T cell proliferation; positive regulation of peptidyl-tyrosine phosphorylation; positive regulation of transcription, DNA-templated; T cell activation; phosphatidylinositol phosphate biosynthetic process; positive regulation of protein kinase B signaling; immune response; signal transduction; cell surface receptor signaling pathway; cytokine-mediated signaling pathway; negative regulation of T cell proliferation
Sources:Amigo / QuickGO
Orthologs
Databases	NCBI: entry; OMA: entry
Species	Human	Mouse
Entrez	941	12519
Ensembl	ENSG00000121594	ENSMUSG00000075122
UniProt	P33681	Q00609
RefSeq (mRNA)	NM_005191	NM_009855; NM_001359898
RefSeq (protein)	NP_005182	NP_033985; NP_001346827
Location (UCSC)	Chr 3: 119.52 – 119.56 Mb	Chr 16: 38.28 – 38.32 Mb
PubMed search
- Wikidata
View/Edit Human	View/Edit Mouse

The Cluster of differentiation 80 (also CD80 and B7-1) is a B7, type I membrane protein in the immunoglobulin superfamily, with an extracellular immunoglobulin constant-like domain and a variable-like domain required for receptor binding. It is closely related to CD86, another B7 protein (B7-2), and often works in tandem. Both CD80 and CD86 interact with costimulatory receptors CD28, CTLA-4 (CD152) and the p75 neurotrophin receptor.

== Structure ==
CD80 is a member of the B7 family, which consists of molecules present at APCs and their receptors present on the T-cells. CD80 is present specifically on DC, activated B-cells, and macrophages, but also T-cells. CD80 is also a transmembrane glycoprotein and a member of the Ig superfamily. It is composed of 288 amino acids, and its mass is 33 kDa. It consists of two Ig-like extracellular domains (208 AA), a transmembrane helical segment (21 AA), and a short cytoplasmic tail (25 AA). The Ig-like extracellular domains are formed by single V-type and C2-type domains. It is expressed as both monomers or dimers, but predominantly dimers. These two forms exist in dynamic equilibrium.

CD80 shares 25% of sequences with CD86; however, CD80 has a ten-fold higher affinity for CD28 and CTLA-4 than CD86. Moreover, CD80 interacts with its ligand with faster binding kinetics and slower dissociation constants than CD86. Both human CD80 and CD86 are located at chromosome 3; the exact region is 3q13.3-q21.

Human and murine CD80 share approximately 44% of sequences. Also both human and murine CD80 are able to cross-react with both human and murine CD28. This indicates that the binding site of CD80 is conserved.

== Function ==
CD80 can be found on the surface of various immune cells, including B-cells, monocytes, or T-cells, but most typically at antigen-presenting cells (APCs) such as dendritic cells. CD80 has a crucial role in modulating T-cell immune function as a checkpoint protein at the immunological synapse.

CD80 is the ligand for the proteins CD28 (for autoregulation and intercellular association) and CTLA-4 (for attenuation of regulation and cellular disassociation) found on the surface of T-cells. Interaction of CD80 with CD28 triggers costimulatory signals and results in enhanced and sustained T-cell activation. In contrast, contrary interaction of CD80 with CTLA-4 inhibits parts of T-cell effector function. These two ligands are structurally homologous, and they compete with each other for binding sites. However, the bond with CTLA-4 has up to 2500 fold higher avidity than with CD28. This illustrates that inhibitory interaction with CTLA-4 is predominant.

CD80 binds to CD28 and CTLA-4 with lower affinity and fast binding kinetics (K_{d} = 4 μM for CD28 and 0.42 μM for CTLA-4), allowing for quick interactions between the communicating cells. These interactions result in an important costimulatory signal in the immunological synapse between antigen-presenting cells, B-cells, dendritic cells and T-cells that result in T and B-cell activation, proliferation and differentiation.

When stimulated by CD80, T helper cells preferentially differentiate into Th1 cells. CD80 is an essential component in dendritic cell licensing and cytotoxic T-cell activation. When the major histocompatibility complex class II (MHC class II)-peptide complex on a dendritic cell interacts with the receptor on a T helper cell, CD80 is up-regulated, licensing the dendritic cell and allowing for interaction between the dendritic cell and CD 8^{+} T-cells via CD28. This helps to signal the T-cell differentiation into a cytotoxic T-cell. The expression of CD80, as well as CD86, is increased by the presence of microbes and cytokines, which is the consequence of the presence of microbes. This mechanism ensures that costimulatory molecules for T-cells are present at the right time.

CD80, often in tandem with CD86, plays a large and diverse role in regulating both the adaptive and the innate immune system. As mentioned above, this protein is crucial for immune cell activation in response to pathogens. The interaction of CD80 with CD28, together with TCR and MHC interaction, results in activation of nuclear factor-κB (NF-ⲕB), mitogen-activated protein kinase (MAPK), and the calcium-calcineurin pathway. These changes initiate the production of numerous factors, cytokines, and chemokines by T-cells. Noteworthy is the production of interleukin 2 (IL-2) as well as ɑ-chain of CD25 (which is a receptor of IL-2), CD40 ligand, tumor necrosis factor-α (TNFα), TNF-β, and interferon-γ (IFN-γ). T-cells also increase the production of macrophage inflammatory proteins 1α and 1β (MIP-α1 and MIP-1β) and prevent apoptosis by induction of anti-apoptotic protein expression (e.g., Bcl-X and Bcl-2). CD80 interaction with CD28 also further stimulates dendritic cells, enhancing cytokine production, specifically IL-6, a pro-inflammatory molecule. Neutrophils can also activate macrophages with CD80 via CD28. Last but not least, the interaction of CD80 and CD28 enhances cell-cycle progression by upregulating the expression levels of D-cyclin.

In contrast to the stimulatory interaction with CD28, CD80 also regulates the immune system through an inhibitory interaction with CTLA-4. Dendritic cells are suppressed by a CTLA-4-CD80 interaction, and this interaction also promotes the suppressive effects of regulatory T cells, which can prevent an immune response to self-antigen.

In addition to interactions with CD28 and CTLA-4, CD80 is also thought to interact with a separate ligand on Natural Killer cells, triggering the Natural Killer cell-mediated cell death of the CD80 carrier. CD80 may also play a role in the negative regulation of effector and memory T-cells. If the interaction between an antigen-presenting cell and a T-cell is stable enough, the T-cell can remove the CD80 from the antigen-presenting cell by a mechanism dubbed trans-endocytosis. Under the right conditions, this transfer of the CD80 may induce T-cell apoptosis. Finally, CD80 signaling on activated B-cells may regulate antibody secretion during infection.

Another ligand of CD80 is programmed death-ligand 1 (PD-L1), expressed on the surface of T-cells, B-cells, DCs, and macrophages. This interaction is inhibiting and causes a reduction in T-cell activation as well as reduction of cytokine production. Its dissociation constant with CD80 is between the CD28 and CTLA-40 (Kd = 1.4 μM).

== Clinical significance ==
The complicated role CD80 plays in immune system regulation presents an opportunity for CD80 interactions to go rogue in various diseases. The up-regulation of CD80 has been linked to various autoimmune diseases, including multiple sclerosis, systemic lupus erythematosus and sepsis (which may partly be due to over-active T-cells), and CD80 has also been shown to help spread of HIV infection in the body. CD80 is also linked to various cancers, though some experience CD80 induced tolerance via possible regulatory T-cell interaction. Others experience inhibited growth and metastasis-related to CD80 up-regulation, further exemplifies the complicated role CD80 plays.

The triggering of Natural Killer cell-mediated death via CD80 interactions has been explored as possible cancer immunotherapy by inducing CD80 expression on tumor cells.

== See also ==
- Cluster of differentiation
- CD86
- CD28
