= AP2M1 =

Protein-coding gene in the species Homo sapiens

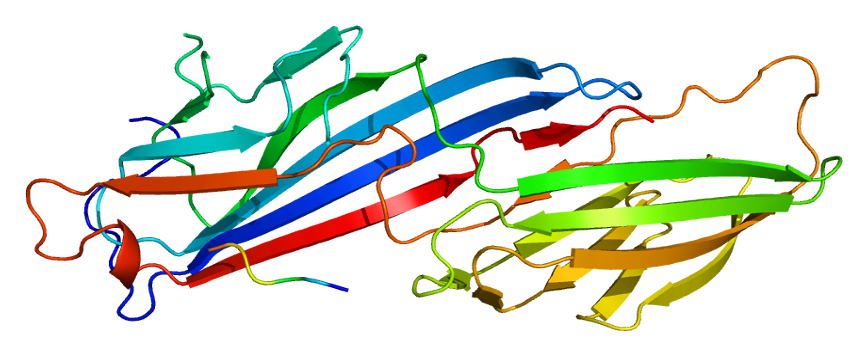

Identifiers
- Aliases: AP2M1, AP50, CLAPM1, mu2, adaptor related protein complex 2 mu 1 subunit, adaptor related protein complex 2 subunit mu 1, MRD60
- External IDs: OMIM: 601024; MGI: 1298405; GeneCards: AP2M1
Available structures
PDB	Ortholog search: PDBe RCSB
PDB	List of PDB id codes 1H6E, 2JKT, 2JKR, 2VGL, 2BP5

Gene location (Human)
Chr.	Chromosome 3 (human)
Band	3q27.1	Start	184,174,689 bp
Band	3q27.1	End	184,184,214 bp

Gene location (Mouse)
Chr.	Chromosome 16 (mouse)
Band	16|16 A3	Start	20,354,228 bp
Band	16|16 A3	End	20,363,659 bp
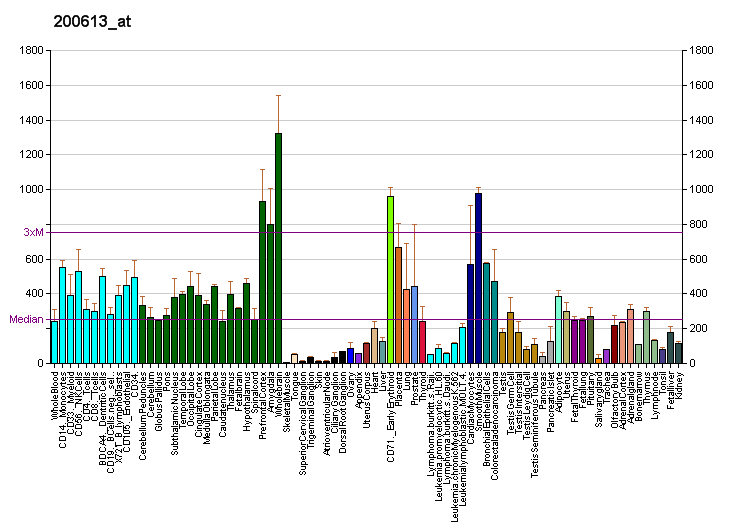
RNA expression pattern
Bgee	Human / Mouse (ortholog); Top expressed in: right frontal lobe; prefrontal cortex; right hemisphere of cerebellum; right adrenal gland; right adrenal cortex; stromal cell of endometrium; left adrenal gland; left adrenal cortex; cingulate gyrus; ganglionic eminence / Top expressed in: primary visual cortex; Cortex of frontal lobe; olfactory bulb; superior frontal gyrus; dentate gyrus of hippocampal formation granule cell; neural layer of retina; neural tube; mesencephalon; hippocampus proper; hypothalamus; More reference expression data
BioGPS	More reference expression data
Gene ontology
Molecular function	lipid binding; clathrin adaptor activity; transporter activity; transmembrane transporter binding; protein binding; signal sequence binding; low-density lipoprotein particle receptor binding
Cellular component	extracellular exosome; lysosomal membrane; AP-2 adaptor complex; endocytic vesicle membrane; cytosol; membrane; endolysosome membrane; clathrin adaptor complex; clathrin-coated pit; clathrin-coated endocytic vesicle membrane; plasma membrane; clathrin-coated endocytic vesicle
Biological process	ephrin receptor signaling pathway; mitigation of host defenses by virus; clathrin-dependent endocytosis; negative regulation of protein localization to plasma membrane; antigen processing and presentation of exogenous peptide antigen via MHC class II; endocytosis; protein transport; vesicle-mediated transport; intracellular protein transport; Wnt signaling pathway, planar cell polarity pathway; microtubule-based movement; membrane organization; low-density lipoprotein particle receptor catabolic process; low-density lipoprotein particle clearance; transport; vesicle budding from membrane; receptor internalization; regulation of vesicle size
Sources:Amigo / QuickGO
Orthologs
Databases	NCBI: entry; OMA: entry
Species	Human	Mouse
Entrez	1173	11773
Ensembl	ENSG00000161203	ENSMUSG00000022841
UniProt	Q96CW1	P84091
RefSeq (mRNA)	NM_004068; NM_001025205; NM_001311198	NM_009679; NM_001302970
RefSeq (protein)	NP_001020376; NP_001298127; NP_004059	NP_001289899; NP_033809
Location (UCSC)	Chr 3: 184.17 – 184.18 Mb	Chr 16: 20.35 – 20.36 Mb
PubMed search
- Wikidata
View/Edit Human	View/Edit Mouse

AP-2 complex subunit mu is a protein that in humans is encoded by the AP2M1 gene.

== Function ==
This gene encodes a subunit of the heterotetrameric coat assembly protein complex 2 (AP2), which belongs to the adaptor complexes medium subunits family. The encoded protein is required for the activity of a vacuolar ATPase, which is responsible for proton pumping occurring in the acidification of endosomes and lysosomes. The encoded protein may also play an important role in regulating the intracellular trafficking and function of CTLA-4 protein. Two transcript variants encoding different isoforms have been found for this gene.

== Interactions ==
AP2M1 has been shown to interact with CTLA-4 and Alpha-1B adrenergic receptor.
