= Belatacept =

Pharmaceutical drug

Clinical data
- Trade names: Nulojix
- AHFS/Drugs.com: Monograph
- MedlinePlus: a606016
- License data: EU EMA: by INN; US DailyMed: Belatacept; US FDA: Belatacept
- Pregnancy category: AU: C
- Routes of administration: Intravenous
- ATC code: L04AA28 (WHO)

Legal status
- Legal status: AU: S4 (Prescription only); UK: POM (Prescription only); US: ℞-only; EU: Rx-only

Identifiers
- CAS Number: 706808-37-9
- DrugBank: DB06681
- ChemSpider: None
- UNII: E3B2GI648A
- KEGG: D03222

Belatacept, sold under the brand name Nulojix, is a fusion protein composed of the Fc fragment of a human IgG1 immunoglobulin linked to the extracellular domain of CTLA-4, which is a molecule crucial in the regulation of T cell costimulation, selectively blocking the process of T-cell activation. It is intended to provide extended graft and transplant survival while limiting the toxicity generated by standard immune suppressing regimens, such as calcineurin inhibitors. It differs from abatacept (Orencia) by only two amino acids.

Belatacept was developed by Bristol-Myers-Squibb and approved by the U.S. Food and Drug Administration (FDA) on June 15, 2011.
