= VEL-101 =

VEL-101, formerly FR104, is an experimental monovalent, pegylated fab' antibody against CD28. It is developed for transplant rejection and autoimmune diseases.
