= Bcl-x interacting domain =

Bclx_interact
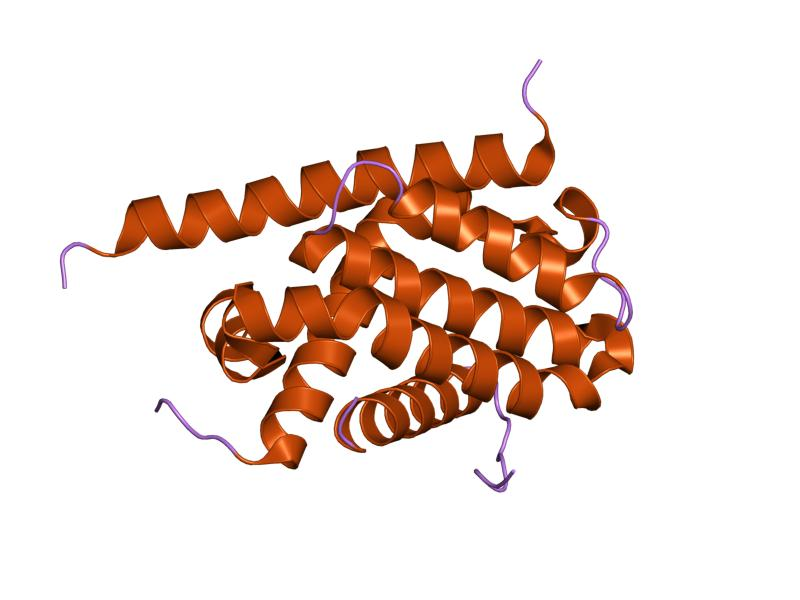
- crystal structure of bcl-xl/bim

Identifiers
- Symbol: Bclx_interact
- Pfam: PF08945
- InterPro: IPR015040
Available protein structures:
- Pfam: structures / ECOD
- PDB: RCSB PDB; PDBe; PDBj
- PDBsum: structure summary

In molecular biology, the Bcl-x interacting domain is a protein domain found in BAM, Bim and Bcl2-like protein 11. It is a long alpha helix, which is required for interaction with Bcl-x.
