= Regulatory T cell =

White blood cells of the immune system

The regulatory T cells (Tregs /ˈtiːrɛɡ/ or T_{reg} cells), formerly known as suppressor T cells, are a subpopulation of T cells that modulate the immune system, maintain tolerance to self-antigens, and prevent autoimmune disease. T_{reg} cells are immunosuppressive and generally suppress or downregulate induction and proliferation of effector T cells. T_{reg} cells express the biomarkers CD4, FOXP3, and CD25 and are thought to be derived from the same lineage as naïve CD4^{+} cells. Because effector T cells also express CD4 and CD25, T_{reg} cells are very difficult to effectively discern from effector CD4^{+}, making them difficult to study. Research has found that the cytokine transforming growth factor beta (TGF-β) is essential for T_{reg} cells to differentiate from naïve CD4^{+} cells and is important in maintaining T_{reg} cell homeostasis.

Mouse models have suggested that modulation of T_{reg} cells can treat autoimmune disease and cancer and can facilitate organ transplantation and wound healing. Their implications for cancer are complicated. T_{reg} cells tend to be upregulated in individuals with cancer, and they seem to be recruited to the site of many tumors. Studies in both humans and animal models have implicated that high numbers of T_{reg} cells in the tumor microenvironment is indicative of a poor prognosis, and T_{reg} cells are thought to suppress tumor immunity, thus hindering the body's innate ability to control the growth of cancerous cells. Immunotherapy research is studying how regulation of T cells could possibly be utilized in the treatment of cancer.

The 2025 Nobel Prize in Physiology or Medicine was awarded jointly to Mary E. Brunkow, Frederick J. Ramsdell, and Shimon Sakaguchi for "their discoveries concerning peripheral immune tolerance", largely due to their work identifying and characterizing T_{reg} cells.

== Populations ==
T regulatory cells are a component of the immune system that suppress immune responses of other cells. This is an important "self-check" built into the immune system to prevent excessive reactions. Regulatory T cells come in many forms with the most well-understood being those that express CD4, CD25, and FOXP3 (CD4^{+}CD25^{+} regulatory T cells). These T_{reg} cells are different from helper T cells. Another regulatory T cell subset is T_{reg}17 cells. Regulatory T cells are involved in shutting down immune responses after they have successfully eliminated invading organisms, and also in preventing autoimmunity.

CD4^{+} FOXP3^{+} CD25(high) regulatory T cells have been called "naturally occurring" regulatory T cells to distinguish them from "suppressor" T cell populations that are generated in vitro. Additional regulatory T cell populations include Tr1, T_{h}3, CD8^{+}CD28^{−}, and Qa-1 restricted T cells. The contribution of these populations to self-tolerance and immune homeostasis is less well defined. FOXP3 can be used as a good marker for mouse CD4^{+}CD25^{+} T cells, although recent studies have also shown evidence for FOXP3 expression in CD4^{+}CD25^{−} T cells. In humans, FOXP3 is also expressed by recently activated conventional T cells and thus does not specifically identify human T_{reg}s.

== Development ==
All T cells derive from progenitor cells in the bone marrow, which become committed to their lineage in the thymus. All T cells begin as CD4-CD8-TCR- cells at the DN (double-negative) stage, where an individual cell will rearrange its T cell receptor genes to form a unique, functional molecule, which they, in turn, test against cells in the thymic cortex for a minimal level of interaction with self-MHC. If they receive these signals, they proliferate and express both CD4 and CD8, becoming double-positive cells. The selection of T_{reg}s occurs on radio-resistant hematopoietically derived MHC class II-expressing cells in the medulla or Hassall's corpuscles in the thymus. At the DP (double-positive) stage, they are selected by their interaction with the cells within the thymus, begin the transcription of Foxp3, and become T_{reg} cells, although they may not begin to express Foxp3 until the single-positive stage, at which point they are functional T_{reg}s. T_{reg}s do not have the limited TCR expression of NKT or γδ T cells; T_{reg}s have a larger TCR diversity than effector T cells, biased towards self-peptides.

The process of T_{reg} selection is determined by the affinity of interaction with the self-peptide MHC complex. Selection to become a T_{reg} is a "Goldilocks" process - i.e. not too high, not too low, but just right; a T cell that receives very strong signals will undergo apoptotic death; a cell that receives a weak signal will survive and be selected to become an effector cell. If a T cell receives an intermediate signal, then it will become a regulatory cell. Due to the stochastic nature of the process of T cell activation, all T cell populations with a given TCR will end up with a mixture of T_{eff} and T_{reg} – the relative proportions determined by the affinities of the T cell for the self-peptide-MHC. Even in mouse models with TCR-transgenic cells selected on specific-antigen-secreting stroma, deletion or conversion is not complete.

After interaction with the self-peptide MHC complex, a T cell must upregulate IL-2R, CD25 and the TNFR superfamily members GITR, OX40 and TNFR2 to become a CD25^{+}FOXP3^{−} T_{reg} cell progenitor. Expression of the transcription factor FOXP3 is then required for this cell to become a mature T_{reg}. Foxp3 expression is driven by γ-chain (CD132) dependent cytokines, in particular IL-2 and/or IL-15. IL-2 alone is not sufficient to stimulate Foxp3 expression. While IL-2 is produced by self-reactive thymocytes, IL-15 is produced by stromal cells of the thymus, mainly mTECs and cTECs.

Recently, another subset of T_{reg} precursors was identified. This subset lacks CD25 and has low expression of Foxp3. Its development is mainly dependent on IL-15. This subset has a lower affinity for self antigens than the CD25^{+}Foxp3^{high} subset. Both subsets generate mature T_{reg} cells after stimulation with IL-2 with comparable efficiency both in vitro and in vivo. CD25^{+}Foxp3^{high} progenitors exhibit increased apoptosis and develop into mature T_{reg} cells with faster kinetics than Foxp3^{low} progenitors. T_{regs} derived from CD25^{+}Foxp3^{high} progenitors protect from experimental auto-immune encephalomyelitis, whereas those derived from CD25^{+}Foxp3^{low} progenitors protect from T-cell induced colitis.

Mature CD25+Foxp3+ Tregs can be also divided into two different subsets based on the expression level of CD25, GITR, and PD-1. Tregs expressing low amounts of CD25, GITR and PD-1 limit the development of colitis by promoting the conversion of conventional CD4^{+} T cells into pTreg. Tregs highly expressing CD25, GITR and PD-1 are more self-reactive and control lymphoproliferation in peripheral lymph nodes - they may have the ability to protect against autoimmune disorders.

Foxp3^{+} T_{reg} generation in the thymus is delayed by several days compared to T_{eff} cells and does not reach adult levels in either the thymus or periphery until around three weeks post-partum. T_{reg} cells require CD28 co-stimulation and B7.2 expression is largely restricted to the medulla, the development of which seems to parallel the development of Foxp3^{+} cells. It has been suggested that the two are linked, but no definitive link between the processes has yet been shown. TGF-β is not required for T_{reg} functionality, in the thymus, as thymic T_{reg}s from TGF-β insensitive TGFβRII-DN mice are functional.

=== Thymic recirculation ===
It has been observed that some FOXP3^{+} T_{reg} cells recirculate to thymus. These T_{regs} were mainly present in thymic medulla, which is the main site of T_{reg} cells differentiation. The presence of these cells in the thymus or their addition to fetal thymic tissue culture suppress the development of new T_{reg} cells by 34–60% without affecting conventional T cells. This suggests that these T_{regs} only inhibit de novo development of T_{reg} cells. The molecular mechanism of this process depends upon the ability of T_{regs} to adsorb IL-2 from their microenvironments, an ability that allows them to induce the apoptosis of T cells that need IL-2 as main growth factor. Recirculating Tregs in the thymus express high levels of the high-affinity IL-2 receptor α chain (CD25), encoded by the Il2ra gene, which gathers IL-2 from thymic medulla and decreases its concentration. In contrast, newly-generated FOXP3^{+} T_{reg} cells in thymus do not have a high level of Il2ra expression. IL-2 is a cytokine necessary for the development of T_{reg} cells in the thymus. It is involved in the proliferation and survival of all T cells, but IL-15 may replace its activity in many contexts. However, T_{reg} cells' development is dependent on IL-2. A population of CD31 negative T_{reg} cells has been found in the human thymus, suggesting that CD31 may be used as a marker for newly-generated T_{reg} cells and other T lymphocytes. Mature and peripheral T_{reg} cells downregulate the expression of CD31, suggesting that this mechanism of thymic T_{reg} development may also be functional in humans.

There is probably also positive regulation of thymic T_{reg} cells development caused by recirculating T_{reg} cells into thymus. A thymic population of CD24 low FOXP3^{+} has been discovered with increased expression of IL-1R2 (Il1r2) compared to peripheral T_{reg} cells. High concentrations of IL-1β caused by inflammation decrease de novo development of T_{reg} cells in the thymus. The presence of recirculating T_{reg} cells in the thymus with high IL1R2 expression during inflammatory conditions helps to uptake IL-1β and reduce its concentration in the medulla microenvironment, thus aiding the development of de novo T_{reg} cells. Binding of IL-1β to IL1R2 on the surface of T_{reg} cells does not cause signal transduction because the Intracellular (TIR) Toll interleukin-1 receptor domain, which is normally present in innate immune cells, is absent in T_{regs}.

== Function ==
The immune system must be able to discriminate between self and non-self. When self/non-self discrimination fails, the immune system destroys cells and tissues of the body and as a result causes autoimmune diseases. Regulatory T cells actively suppress activation of the immune system and prevent pathological self-reactivity, i.e. autoimmune disease. The critical role regulatory T cells play within the immune system is evidenced by the severe autoimmune syndrome that results from a genetic deficiency in regulatory T cells (IPEX syndrome – see also below).

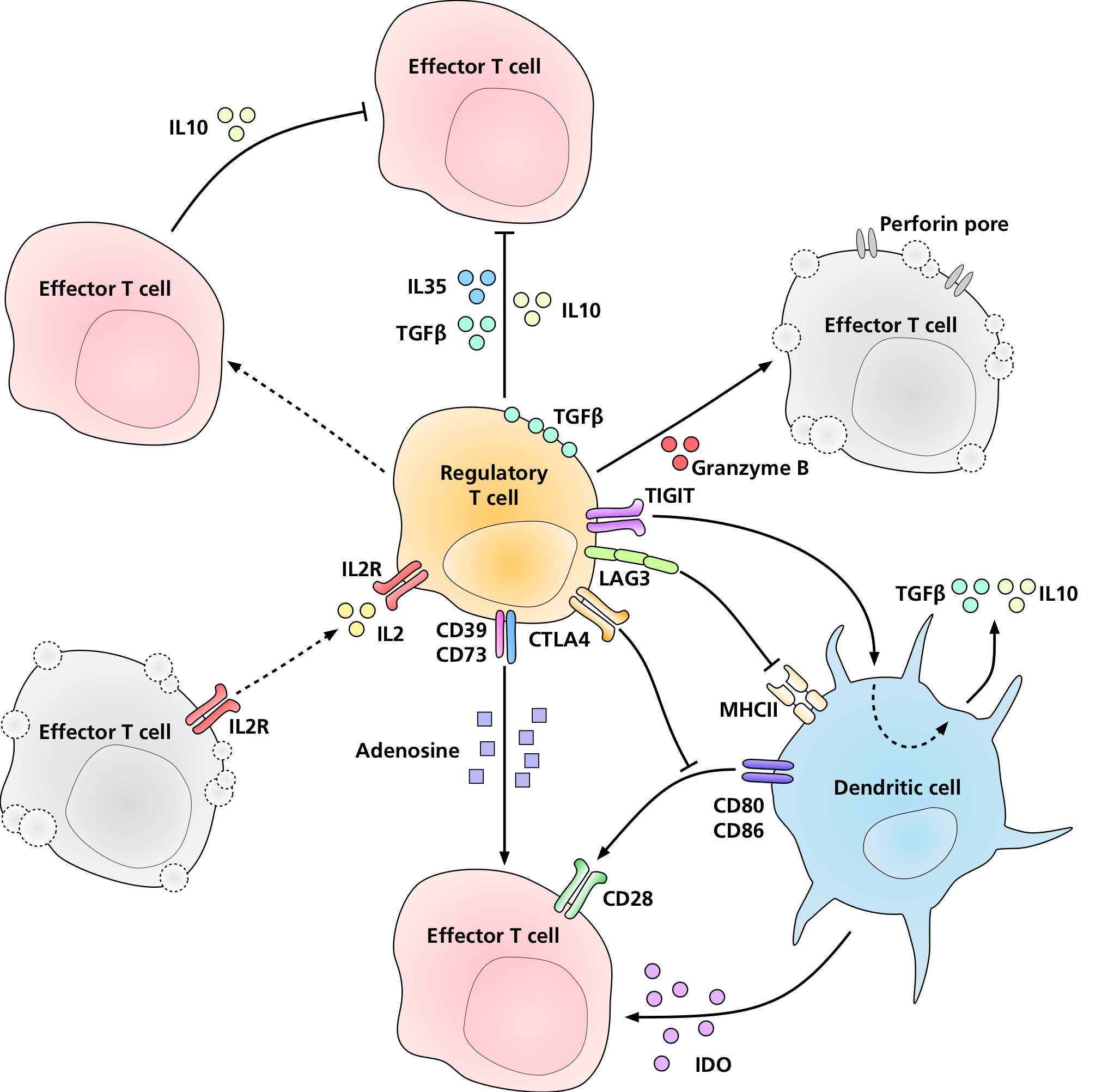
Diagram of regulatory T cell, effector T cells and dendritic cell showing putative mechanisms of suppression by regulatory T cells.

The molecular mechanism by which regulatory T cells exert their suppressor/regulatory activity has not been definitively characterized and is the subject of intense research. In vitro experiments have given mixed results regarding the requirement of cell-to-cell contact with the cell being suppressed. The following represent some of the proposed mechanisms of immune suppression:

- Regulatory T cells produce a number of inhibitory cytokines. These include TGF-β, interleukin 35, and interleukin 10. It also appears that regulatory T cells can induce other cell types to express interleukin 10.
- Regulatory T cells can produce granzyme B, which in turn can induce apoptosis of effector cells. Regulatory T cells from granzyme B-deficient mice are reported to be less effective suppressors of the activation of effector T cells.
- Reverse signalling through direct interaction with dendritic cells and the induction of immunosuppressive indoleamine 2,3-dioxygenase.
- Signalling through the ectoenzymes CD39 and CD73 with the production of immunosuppressive adenosine.
- Through direct interactions with dendritic cells by LAG3 and by TIGIT. This review of T_{reg} interactions with dendritic cells provides distinction between mechanisms described for human cells versus mouse cells.
- Another control mechanism is through the IL-2 feedback loop. Antigen-activated T cells produce IL-2 which then acts on IL-2 receptors on regulatory T cells alerting them to the fact that high T cell activity is occurring in the region, and they mount a suppressory response against them. This is a negative feedback loop to ensure that overreaction is not occurring. If an actual infection is present other inflammatory factors downregulate the suppression. Disruption of the loop leads to hyperreactivity, regulation can modify the strength of the immune response. A related suggestion with regard to interleukin 2 is that activated regulatory T cells take up interleukin 2 so avidly that they deprive effector T cells of sufficient to avoid apoptosis.
- A major mechanism of suppression by regulatory T cells is through the prevention of co-stimulation through CD28 on effector T cells by the action of the molecule CTLA-4.
- Regulatory T cells also perform tissue-specific roles in repair, tolerance, and modulation of inflammation across the central nervous system, gastrointestinal tract, joints, skin, and lungs.

== Natural and induced regulatory T cells ==
T regulatory lymphocytes develop during ontogeny either in the thymus or in the periphery. Accordingly, they are divided into natural and induced T regulatory cells.

Natural T regulatory lymphocytes (tTregs, nTregs) are characterized by continuous expression of FoxP3 and T cell receptor (TCR) with relatively high autoaffinity. These cells are predominantly found in the body in the bloodstream or lymph nodes and serve mainly to confer tolerance to autoantigens.

Induced (peripheral) T regulatory cells (iTregs, pTregs) arise under certain situations in the presence of IL-2 and TGF-b in the periphery and begin to express FoxP3 inducibly, thus becoming the functional equivalent of tTreg cells. iTregs, however, are found primarily in peripheral barrier tissues, where they are primarily involved in preventing inflammation in the presence of external antigens.

The main features that differentiate tTreg and iTreg cells include Helios and Neuropilin-1, the presence of which suggests origin in the thymus. Another feature distinguishing these two Treg cell populations is the stability of FoxP3 expression in different settings.

=== Induced T regulatory cells ===
Induced regulatory T (iT_{reg}) cells (CD4^{+} CD25^{+} FOXP3^{+}) are suppressive cells involved in tolerance. iT_{reg} cells have been shown to suppress T cell proliferation and experimental autoimmune diseases. These cells include T_{reg}17 cells. iT_{reg} cells develop from mature CD4^{+} conventional T cells outside of the thymus: a defining distinction between natural regulatory T (nT_{reg}) cells and iT_{reg} cells. Though iT_{reg} and nT_{reg} cells share a similar function iT_{reg} cells have recently been shown to be "an essential non-redundant regulatory subset that supplements nT_{reg} cells, in part by expanding TCR diversity within regulatory responses". Acute depletion of the iT_{reg} cell pool in mouse models has resulted in inflammation and weight loss. The contribution of nT_{reg} cells versus iT_{reg} cells in maintaining tolerance is unknown, but both are important. Epigenetic differences have been observed between nT_{reg} and iT_{reg} cells, with the former having more stable FOXP3 expression and wider demethylation.

The small intestinal environment is high in vitamin A and is a location where retinoic acid is produced. The retinoic acid and TGF-beta produced by dendritic cells within this area signal for production of regulatory T cells. Vitamin A and TGF-beta promote T cell differentiation into regulatory T cells opposed to T_{h}17 cells, even in the presence of IL-6. The intestinal environment can lead to induced regulatory T cells with TGF-beta and retinoic acid, some of which express the lectin-like receptor CD161 and are specialized to maintain barrier integrity by accelerating wound healing. The T_{reg}s within the gut are differentiated from naïve T cells after antigen is introduced. It has recently been shown that human regulatory T cells can be induced from both naive and pre-committed Th1 cells and Th17 cells using a parasite-derived TGF-β mimic, secreted by Heligmosomoides polygyrus and termed Hp-TGM (H. polygyrus TGF-β mimic). Hp-TGM can induce murine FOXP3 expressing regulatory T cells that were stable in the presence of inflammation in vivo. Hp-TGM-induced human FOXP3+ regulatory T cells were stable in the presence of inflammation and had increased levels of CD25, CTLA4 and decreased methylation in the FOXP3 T_{reg}-Specific demethylated region compared to TGF-β-induced T_{reg}s.

=== RORγt+ regulatory T lymphocytes ===
Approximately 30%–40% of colonic FoxP3+ Treg cells express the transcription factor RORγt. The iTregs are able to differentiate into RORγt-expressing cells and thus acquire the phenotype of Th17 cells. These cells are associated with the functions of mucosal lymphoid tissues such as the intestinal barrier. In the intestinal lamina propria, 20–30% of Foxp3+ T regulatory cells expressing RORyt are found and this high proportion is strongly dependent on the presence of a complex gut microbiome. In germ-free (GF) mice, the population of RORγt+ T regulatory cells is strongly reduced, whereas recolonization by the specific pathogen-free (SPF) microbiota restores normal numbers of these lymphocytes in the gut. The mechanism by which the gut microbiota induces the formation of RORγt+ Treg cells involves the production of short-chain fatty acids (SCFAs), on which this induction is dependent. SCFAs are a by-product of fermentation and digestion of dietary fiber, therefore, microbial-free mice have very low concentrations of both SCFAs and RORγt Treg cells. Induction of RORγt Treg cells is also dependent on the presence of dendritic cells in adults, Thetis cells in neonatal and antigen presentation by MHC II.

RORγt+ Treg cells are not present in the thymus and do not express Helios or Neuropilin-1, but have high expression of CD44, IL-10, ICOS, CTLA-4, and the nucleotidases CD39 and CD73, suggesting a strong regulatory function.

==== Function of RORγt+ regulatory T lymphocytes ====
Induction of RORγt+ Treg cells in lymph nodes of the small intestine is crucial for the establishment of intestinal luminal antigen tolerance. These cells are particularly important in the prevention of food allergies. One mechanism is the production of suppressive molecules such as the cytokine IL-10. These cells also suppress the Th17 cell population and inhibit the production of IL-17, thus suppressing the pro-inflammatory response.

In mice, colonic RORγt+ Tregs are absent during the first two weeks after birth. Generation of RORγt+ Treg early after birth is essential to prevent the development of various intestinal immunopathologies later in life. Particularly crucial is a time period of gradual transition from relying solely on maternal milk to incorporating solid food, between 15 and 20 days of age, when a large number of microbial antigens is introduced and commensal microbiota are settling in the intestine. During this time, protective RORγt+ Treg cells are induced by the microbial antigens and normal intestinal homeostasis is sustained by induction of tolerance to commensal microbiota. Lack of RORγt+ Treg cell induction led in mice to the development of severe colitis. The quantity of early-life-induced RORγt+ Tregs is influenced by maternal milk, particularly by the amount of IgA antibodies present in the maternal milk. In adult mice, RORγt+ Tregs and IgA exhibit mutual inhibition. Similarly, mice nursed by foster mothers with higher IgA titers in their milk will develop fewer RORγt+ Tregs compared to those fed with milk containing lower IgA titers.

RORγt+ Tregs were also shown for their importance in oral tolerance and prevention of food allergies. Infants with developed food allergies have different composition of fecal microbiota in comparison to healthy infants and have increased IgE bound to fecal microbiota and decreased secretory IgA. In mice, protection against food allergies was induced by introduction of Clostridiales and Bacteroidales species. Upon their introduction, expansion of gut RORγt+ Treg cells in favor of GATA3+ Treg occurs, mediating the protection against allergies.

Deficiency of tryptophan, an essential amino acid, alters commensal microbiota metabolism which results in expansion of RORγt+ Treg cells and reduction of Gata3+ Treg cells. This induction is possibly regulated by stimulation of aryl hydrocarbon receptor by metabolites produced by commensal bacteria using tryptophan as an energy source.

Lower number of RORγt+ Treg cells is present in germ free mice colonized with microbiota associated with Inflammatory bowel disease compared to germ free mice colonized with healthy microbiota. Dysregulation of RORγt+ Treg cells favors the expansion of Th2 cells and lower number of RORγt+ Treg cells is compensated by increased Helios+ Treg cells. How exactly may RORγt+ Tregs protect from colitis is not yet known.

==== RORγt+ regulatory T lymphocytes in cancer ====
Pathological may be involvement of RORγt+ regulatory T cells in colorectal cancer. It was found, that RORγt+ Tregs which are able to express IL-17 are expanded in colorectal cancer and as cancer develops, they lose the ability to express anti-inflammatory IL-10. Similarly such RORγt+ Tregs expressing IL-17 are expanded in mucosa of patients with Crohn´s disease. Depletion of RORγt+ Tregs in mice with colorectal cancer caused enhancement of reactivity of tumor-specific T cells and improved cancer immune surveillance. This improvement is not caused by the loss of IL-17 as that was proved to promote cancer progression. In tumors of mice with conditional knockout of RORγt+ Tregs was confirmed downregulation of IL-6, reduction of IL-6 expressing CD11c+ dendritic cells and overexpression of CTLA-4. IL-6 mediates activation of STAT3 transcription factor which is critical for proliferation of cancer cells.

=== Gata3+ regulatory T lymphocytes ===
Another important subset of Treg cells are Gata3+ Treg cells, which respond to IL-33 in the gut and influence the regulation of effector T cells during inflammation. Unlike RORγt+ Treg cells, these cells express Helios and are not dependent on the microbiome.

Gata3+ T regs are major immunosuppressors during intestinal inflammation and T regs use Gata3 to limit tissue inflammation. This cell population also restrict Th17 T cells immunity in the intestine, because Gata3-deficient T regs express higher Rorc and IL-17a transcript.

== Disease ==
An important question is how the immunosuppressive activity of regulatory T cells is modulated during the course of an ongoing immune response. While the immunosuppressive function of regulatory T cells prevents the development of autoimmune disease, it is not desirable during immune responses to infectious microorganisms.

=== Infections ===
Upon encounter with infectious microorganisms, the activity of regulatory T cells may be downregulated, either directly or indirectly, by other cells to facilitate elimination of the infection. Experimental evidence from mouse models suggests that some pathogens may have evolved to manipulate regulatory T cells to immunosuppress the host and so potentiate their own survival. For example, regulatory T cell activity has been reported to increase in several infectious contexts, such as retroviral infections (the most well-known of which is HIV), mycobacterial infections (e.g., tuberculosis), and various parasitic infections including Leishmania and malaria.

T_{reg} cells play major roles during HIV infection. They suppress the immune system, thus limiting target cells and reducing inflammation, but this simultaneously disrupts the clearance of virus by the cell-mediated immune response and enhances the reservoir by pushing CD4^{+} T cells to a resting state, including infected cells. Additionally, T_{reg} cells can be infected by HIV, increasing the size of the HIV reservoir directly. Thus, T_{reg} cells are being investigated as targets for HIV cure research. Some T_{reg} cell depletion strategies have been tested in SIV infected nonhuman primates, and shown to cause viral reactivation and enhanced SIV specific CD8^{+} T cell responses.

Regulatory T cells have a large role in the pathology of visceral leishmaniasis and in preventing excess inflammation in patients cured of visceral leishmaniasis.

=== ALS ===
There is some evidence that T_{reg} cells may be dysfunctional and driving neuroinflammation in amyotrophic lateral sclerosis due to lower expression of FOXP3. Ex vivo expansion of T_{reg} cells for subsequent autologous transplant is currently being investigated after promising results were obtained in a phase I clinical trial.

=== Pregnancy ===
While regulatory T cells increase via polyclonal expansion both systemically and locally during healthy pregnancies to protect the fetus from the maternal immune response (a process called maternal immune tolerance), evidence suggests that this polyclonal expansion is impaired in preeclamptic mothers and their offspring. Research suggests reduced production and development of regulatory T cells during preeclampsia may degrade maternal immune tolerance, leading to the hyperactive immune response characteristic of preeclampsia.

=== Cancer ===
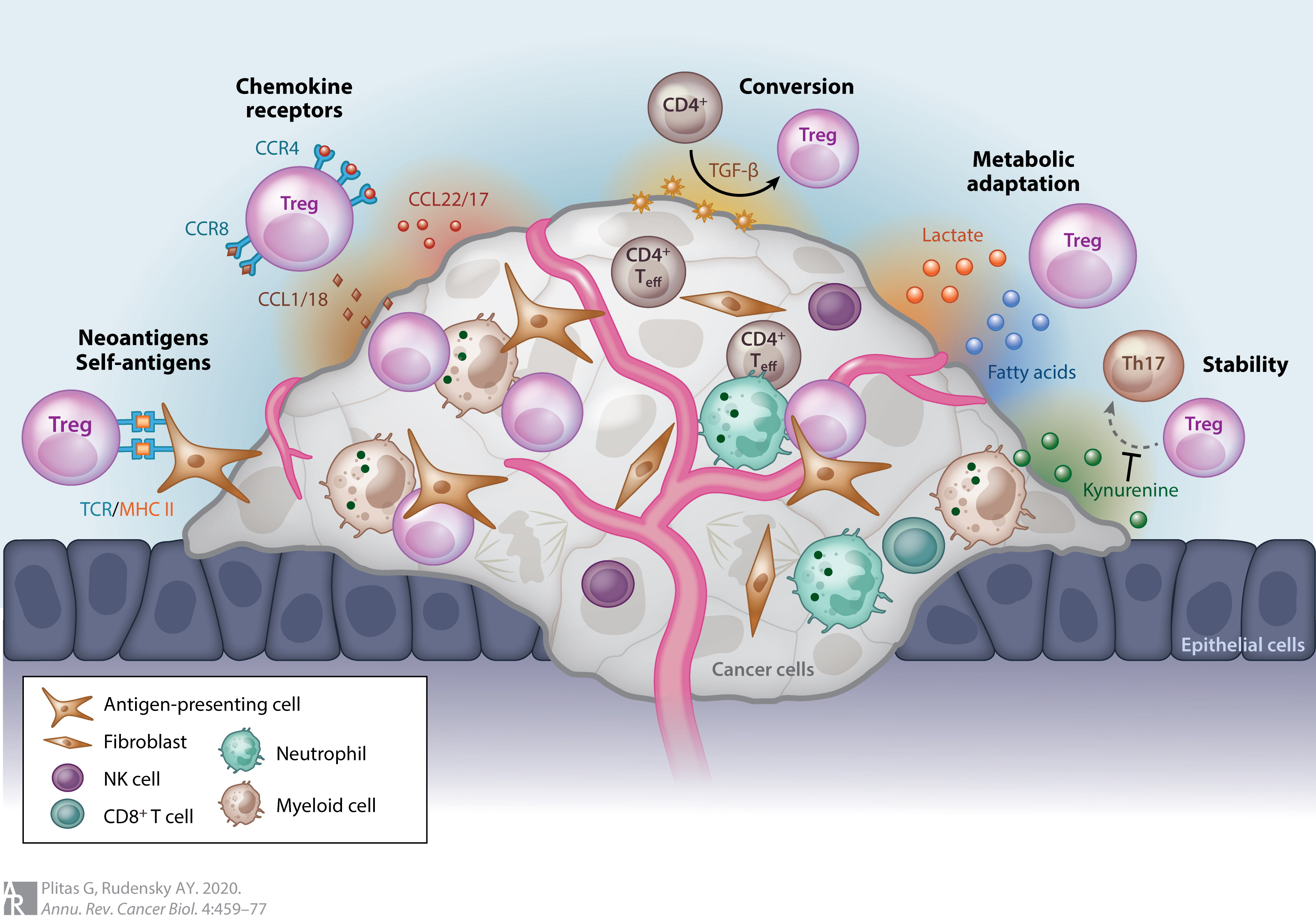
The recruitment and maintenance of T_{reg} cells in the tumor microenvironment

CD4^{+} regulatory T cells are often associated with solid tumours in both humans and murine models. Increased numbers of regulatory T cells in breast, colorectal and ovarian cancers is associated with a poorer prognosis.

CD70^{+} non-Hodgkin lymphoma B cells induce FOXP3 expression and regulatory function in intratumoral CD4^{+}CD25^{−} T cells.

Most tumors elicit an immune response in the host that is mediated by tumor antigens, thus distinguishing the tumor from other non-cancerous cells. This causes large numbers of tumor-infiltrating lymphocytes (TILs) to appear in the tumor microenvironment (TME). These lymphocytes may target cancerous cells and therefore slow or terminate tumor development. However, this process is complicated because T_{reg} cells seem to be preferentially trafficked to the TME. While T_{reg} cells normally make up only about 4% of CD4^{+} T cells, they can make up as much as 20–30% of the CD4^{+} population around the TME.

The ratio of T_{reg} to effector T cells in the TME is a determining factor in the success of the cancer immune response. High levels of T_{reg} cells in the TME are associated with poor prognosis in many cancers, such as ovarian, breast, renal, and pancreatic cancer. This indicates that T_{reg} cells suppress effector T cells and hinder the body's immune response against the cancer. However, in some types of cancer the opposite is true, and high levels of T_{reg} cells are associated with a positive prognosis. This trend is seen in cancers such as colorectal carcinoma and follicular lymphoma. This could be due to T_{reg} cells' ability to suppress general inflammation, which is known to trigger cell proliferation and metastasis . These opposite effects indicate that T_{r} cells' role in the development of cancer is highly dependent on both type and location of the tumor.

Although it is still not entirely understood how T_{reg} cells are preferentially trafficked to the TME, the chemotaxis is probably driven by the production of chemokines by the tumor. T_{reg} infiltration into the TMEis facilitated by the binding of the chemokine receptor CCR4, which is expressed on T_{reg} cells, to its ligand CCL22, which is secreted by many types of tumor cells. T_{reg} cell expansion at the site of the tumor could also explain the increased levels of T_{reg} cells. The cytokine, TGF-β, which is commonly produced by tumor cells, is known to induce the differentiation and expansion of T_{reg} cells.

Forkhead box protein 3 (FOXP3) as a transcription factor is an essential molecular marker of T_{reg} cells. FOXP3 polymorphism (rs3761548) might be involved in the gastric cancer progression through influencing T_{reg} function and the secretion of immunomodulatory cytokines such as IL-10, IL-35, and TGF-β.

T_{reg} cells present in the TME can be either induced T_{reg}s or natural (thymic) T_{reg}s which develop from naive precursors. However, tumor-associated T_{reg}s may also originate from IL-17A^{+}Foxp3^{+} T_{reg}s which develop from Th17 cells.

In general, the immunosuppression of the TMEhas largely contributed to the unsuccessful outcomes of many cancer immunotherapy treatments. Depletion of T_{reg} cells in animal models has shown an increased efficacy of immunotherapy treatments, and therefore, many immunotherapy treatments are now incorporating T_{reg} depletion.

==== Cancer therapies targeting regulatory T lymphocytes ====
T_{reg}s in the TME are abundantly effector T_{reg}s that over-express immunosuppressive molecules such as CTLA-4. Anti-CTLA-4 antibodies cause depletion of T_{reg}s and thus increase CD8^{+} T cells effective against the tumor. Anti-CTLA-4 antibody ipilimumab was approved for patients with advanced melanoma. Immune-checkpoint molecule PD-1 inhibits activation of both conventional T cells and T_{reg}s and use of anti-PD-1 antibodies may lead to activation and immunosuppressive function of T_{reg}s. Resistance to anti-PD-1-mAb treatment is probably caused by enhanced T_{reg} cell activity. Rapid cancer progression upon PD-1 blockade is called hyperprogressive disease. Therapies targeting T_{reg} suppression include anti-CD25 mAbs and anti-CCR4 mAbs. OX40 agonist and GITR agonists are currently being investigated. Therapy targeting TCR signaling is also possible by blocking tyrosine kinases. For example, tyrosine-kinase inhibitor dasatinib is used for treatment of chronic myeloid leukemia and is associated with T_{reg} inhibition.

== Molecular characterization ==
Similar to other T cells, regulatory T cells develop in the thymus. The latest research suggests that regulatory T cells are defined by expression of the forkhead family transcription factor FOXP3 (forkhead box p3). Expression of FOXP3 is required for regulatory T cell development and appears to control a genetic program specifying this cell's fate. The large majority of Foxp3-expressing regulatory T cells are found within the major histocompatibility complex (MHC) class II restricted CD4-expressing (CD4^{+}) population and express high levels of the interleukin-2 receptor alpha chain (CD25). In addition to the FOXP3-expressing CD4^{+} CD25^{+}, there also appears to be a minor population of MHC class I restricted CD8^{+} FOXP3-expressing regulatory T cells. These FOXP3-expressing CD8^{+} T cells do not appear to be functional in healthy individuals but are induced in autoimmune disease states by T cell receptor stimulation to suppress IL-17-mediated immune responses. Unlike conventional T cells, regulatory T cells do not produce IL-2 and are therefore anergic at baseline.

A number of different methods are employed in research to identify and monitor T_{reg} cells. Originally, high expression of CD25 and CD4 surface markers was used (CD4^{+}CD25^{+} cells). This is problematic as CD25 is also expressed on non-regulatory T cells in the setting of immune activation such as during an immune response to a pathogen. As defined by CD4 and CD25 expression, regulatory T cells comprise about 5–10% of the mature CD4^{+} T cell subpopulation in mice and humans, while about 1–2% of T_{reg} can be measured in whole blood. The additional measurement of cellular expression of FOXP3 protein allowed a more specific analysis of T_{reg} cells (CD4^{+}CD25^{+}FOXP3^{+} cells). However, FOXP3 is also transiently expressed in activated human effector T cells, thus complicating a correct T_{reg} analysis using CD4, CD25 and FOXP3 as markers in humans. Therefore, the gold standard surface marker combination to defined T_{reg}s within unactivated CD3^{+}CD4^{+} T cells is high CD25 expression combined with the absent or low-level expression of the surface protein CD127 (IL-7RA). If viable cells are not required then the addition of FOXP3 to the CD25 and CD127 combination will provide further stringency. Several additional markers have been described, e.g., high levels of CTLA-4 (cytotoxic T-lymphocyte associated molecule-4) and GITR (glucocorticoid-induced TNF receptor) are also expressed on regulatory T cells, however the functional significance of this expression remains to be defined. There is a great interest in identifying cell surface markers that are uniquely and specifically expressed on all FOXP3-expressing regulatory T cells. However, to date no such molecule has been identified.

The identification of T_{reg}s following cell activation is challenging as conventional T cells will express CD25, transiently express FOXP3 and lose CD127 expression upon activation. It has been shown that T_{reg}s can be detected using an activation-induced marker assay by expression of CD39 in combination with co-expression of CD25 and OX40(CD134) which define antigen-specific cells following 24-48h stimulation with antigen.

In addition to the search for novel protein markers, a different method to analyze and monitor T_{reg} cells more accurately has been described in the literature. This method is based on DNA methylation analysis. Only in T_{reg} cells, but not in any other cell type, including activated effector T cells, a certain region within the FOXP3 gene (TSDR, T_{reg}-specific-demethylated region) is found demethylated, which allows to monitor T_{reg} cells through a PCR reaction or other DNA-based analysis methods. Interplay between the Th17 cells and regulatory T cells are important in many diseases like respiratory diseases.

Recent evidence suggests that mast cells may be important mediators of T_{reg}-dependent peripheral tolerance.

=== Epitopes ===
Regulatory T cell epitopes ('Tregitopes') were discovered in 2008 and consist of linear sequences of amino acids contained within monoclonal antibodies and immunoglobulin G (IgG). Since their discovery, evidence has indicated Tregitopes may be crucial to the activation of natural regulatory T cells.

Potential applications of regulatory T cell epitopes have been hypothesised: tolerisation to transplants, protein drugs, blood transfer therapies, and type I diabetes as well as reduction of immune response for the treatment of allergies.

== Genetic deficiency ==
Genetic mutations in the gene encoding FOXP3 have been identified in both humans and mice based on the heritable disease caused by these mutations. This disease provides the most striking evidence that regulatory T cells play a critical role in maintaining normal immune system function. Humans with mutations in FOXP3 develop a severe and rapidly fatal autoimmune disorder known as Immune dysregulation, Polyendocrinopathy, Enteropathy X-linked (IPEX) syndrome.

The IPEX syndrome is characterized by the development of overwhelming systemic autoimmunity in the first year of life, resulting in the commonly observed triad of watery diarrhea, eczematous dermatitis, and endocrinopathy seen most commonly as insulin-dependent diabetes mellitus. Most individuals have other autoimmune phenomena including Coombs-positive hemolytic anemia, autoimmune thrombocytopenia, autoimmune neutropenia, and tubular nephropathy. The majority of affected males die within the first year of life of either metabolic derangements or sepsis. An analogous disease is also observed in a spontaneous FOXP3-mutant mouse known as "scurfy".

== See also ==
- List of distinct cell types in the adult human body
