= Abatacept =

Immunomodulating pharmaceutical drug

Clinical data
- Trade names: Orencia
- AHFS/Drugs.com: Monograph
- MedlinePlus: a606016
- License data: EU EMA: by INN; US DailyMed: Abatacept
- Pregnancy category: AU: C
- Routes of administration: Intravenous, subcutaneous
- ATC code: L04AA24 (WHO)

Legal status
- Legal status: UK: POM (Prescription only); US: ℞-only; EU: Rx-only

Pharmacokinetic data
- Elimination half-life: 13.1 days

Identifiers
- CAS Number: 332348-12-6
- DrugBank: DB01281
- ChemSpider: none
- UNII: 7D0YB67S97
- KEGG: D03203
- ChEMBL: ChEMBL1201823

Chemical and physical data
- Formula: C_{3498}H_{5458}N_{922}O_{1090}S_{32}
- Molar mass: 78895.43 g·mol^{−1}

Abatacept, sold under the brand name Orencia, is a medication used to treat autoimmune diseases like rheumatoid arthritis, by interfering with the immune activity of T cells. It is a modified antibody.

Abatacept is a fusion protein composed of the Fc region of the immunoglobulin IgG1 fused to the extracellular domain of CTLA-4. In order for a T cell to be activated and produce an immune response, an antigen-presenting cell must present two signals to the T cell. One of those signals is the major histocompatibility complex (MHC), combined with the antigen, and the other signal is the CD80 or CD86 molecule (also known as B7-1 and B7-2). Abatacept binds to the CD80 and CD86 molecule, and prevents the second signal. Without the second signal, the T cell can't be activated.

Abatacept was developed by Bristol-Myers Squibb and is licensed in the United States for the treatment of rheumatoid arthritis in the case of inadequate response to anti-TNFα therapy. Abatacept received approval from the FDA in 2005.

== Medical uses ==
Abatacept is used to treat adults with moderate to severe rheumatoid arthritis (RA) as a second-line agent, and as a first-line agent for people whose RA is severe and rapidly progressing. It also used to treat psoriatic arthritis and juvenile idiopathic arthritis.

== Contraindications ==
Abatacept has not been tested in pregnant women and it is not known if it is secreted in breast milk; it causes birth defects in rodents when given in very high doses, and is transmitted in rodent breast milk.

Abatacept will likely interfere with any vaccine given while people are taking it.

It should not be used in combination with anakinra or TNF antagonists. Because abatacept, anakinra, and TNF antagonists suppress the immune system, using them in combination may significantly increase the risk for severe infections.

== Adverse effects ==
People have experienced serious infections due to abatacept's suppression of the immune system; some of these infections have been fatal. People with COPD are likely to get lung infections more often than usual. Some people have had anaphylactic reactions to the drug. Abatacept may cause otherwise slow-growing cancers to proliferate and spread, due to suppression of the immune system.

Very common adverse effects (occurring in more than 10% of people) include upper respiratory tract infections. Common adverse effects (occurring in between 1% and 10% of people) include lower respiratory tract infections, urinary tract infections, herpes infections, pneumonia, flu, cough, high blood pressure, stomach pain, diarrhea, nausea, vomiting, upset stomach, mouth sores, elevated transaminases, rashes, fatigue, weakness, local injection site reactions, and systemic injection reactions.

== Chemistry ==
Abatacept is a fusion protein composed of the extracellular domain of CTLA-4 with the hinge, CH2, and CH3 domains of IgG1.

== Mechanism of action ==
Abatacept is a soluble CTLA-4 analog that prevents antigen-presenting cells (APCs) from delivering the co-stimulatory signal. This prevents the T cells from being fully activated, and even downregulates them. Simple signaling without co-stimulation allows the cell to recognize the primary signal as "self" and not ramp-up responses for future responses as well.

In order for T cells to be activated and attack an antigen, that antigen must be presented to the T cell by an APC.

That activation requires two signals (one of which is called co-stimulatory signal or signal 2):

For signal 1, the APC must bind the antigen to a major histocompatibility complex (MHC) molecule, bring that complex to its surface, and present it to the T cell receptor on the surface of the T cell.

For signal 2, the APC must present a B7 protein (CD80 or CD86) on its cell surface to a CD28 protein on the surface of the T cell. These two signals activate the T cell. Without signal 2, the T cell will not be activated, and will become anergic.

Abatacept, which consists of a fusion protein of the extracellular domain of CTLA-4 and human IgG1, binds to the B7 protein on the APC and prevents it from delivering the co-stimulatory signal to the T cell.
