= Acropolis Institute of Technology and Research =

Private college in Madhya Pradesh, India

- Type: Private
- Established: 2005
- Affiliations: RGPV, DAVV
- Director: S. C. Sharma
- Academic staff: 350+
- Administrative staff: 100
- Students: 5500+
- Location: Indore, Madhya Pradesh, India; 22.723695°N 75.874361°E
- Website: aitr.ac.in

Acropolis Institute of Technology and Research (AITR) is a private engineering college located in Indore, Madhya Pradesh, India. It was established in 2005.

Acropolis Institute of Technology and Research - AITR offers bachelor's and master's degrees in engineering and master's degrees in computing and management. It also provides online courses facilities to its student's.The college is affiliated to Rajiv Gandhi Proudyogiki Vishwavidyalaya (RGPV) for BTech, BE, Diploma, ME, B Pharm and M Pharm courses and Devi Ahilya Vishwavidyalaya (DAVV) for Master of Computer Application (MCA), BCA, BBA, BCom, BSc, BA and Master of Business Administration (MBA) courses.
