= CD86 =

Mammalian protein found in humans

Identifiers
- Aliases: CD86, B7-2, B7.2, B70, CD28LG2, LAB72, CD86 molecule
- External IDs: OMIM: 601020; MGI: 101773; GeneCards: CD86
Available structures
PDB	Ortholog search: PDBe RCSB
PDB	List of PDB id codes 1I85, 1NCN

Gene location (Human)
Chr.	Chromosome 3 (human)
Band	3q13.33	Start	122,055,362 bp
Band	3q13.33	End	122,121,139 bp

Gene location (Mouse)
Chr.	Chromosome 16 (mouse)
Band	16 B3|16 25.72 cM	Start	36,424,231 bp
Band	16 B3|16 25.72 cM	End	36,486,443 bp
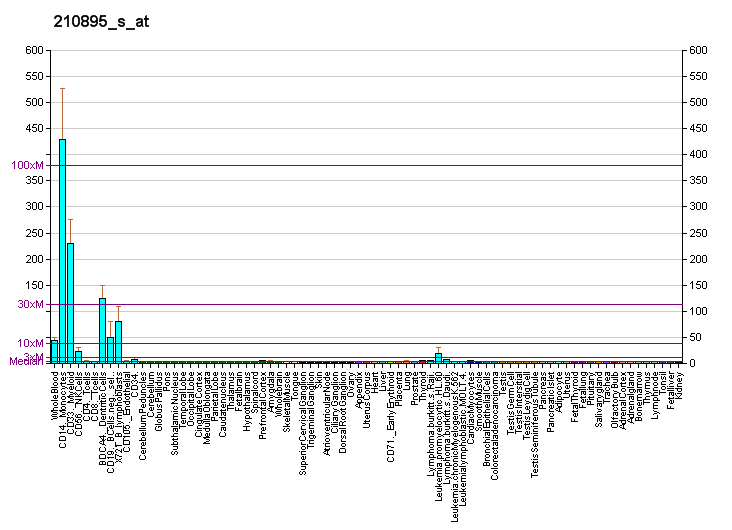

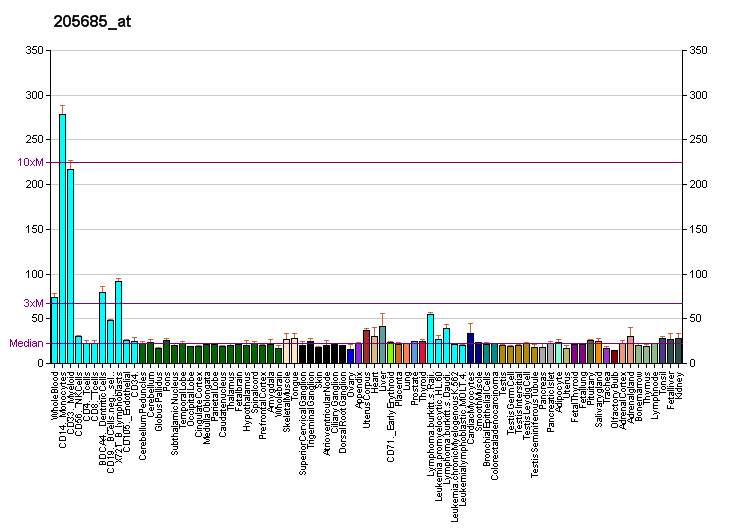

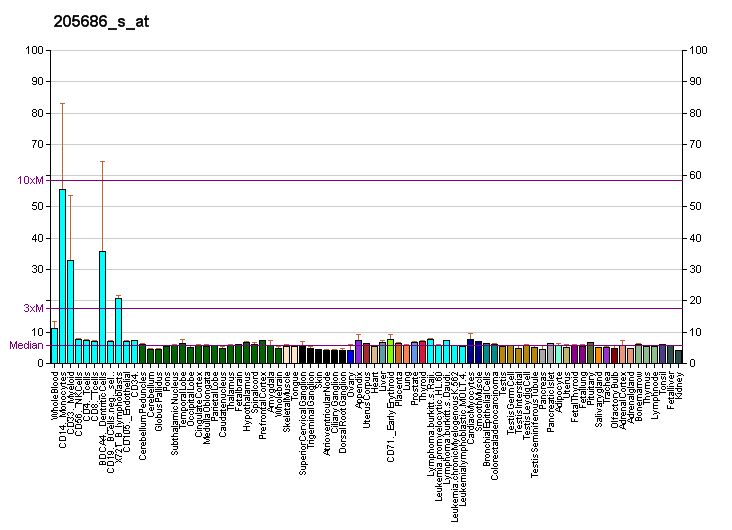
RNA expression pattern
Bgee	Human / Mouse (ortholog); Top expressed in: monocyte; granulocyte; appendix; testicle; blood; lymph node; gallbladder; spleen; right lung; rectum / Top expressed in: spleen; lumbar spinal ganglion; granulocyte; mesenteric lymph nodes; thymus; stroma of bone marrow; blood; subcutaneous adipose tissue; Paneth cell; lumbar subsegment of spinal cord; More reference expression data
BioGPS	More reference expression data
Gene ontology
Molecular function	coreceptor activity; virus receptor activity; protein binding; signaling receptor binding; phosphatidylinositol-4,5-bisphosphate 3-kinase activity; signaling receptor activity
Cellular component	integral component of membrane; intracellular membrane-bounded organelle; membrane; plasma membrane; cell surface; extracellular exosome; external side of plasma membrane
Biological process	response to yeast; adaptive immune response; response to interferon-gamma; immune system process; cell-cell signaling; T cell costimulation; ageing; myeloid dendritic cell differentiation; cellular response to cytokine stimulus; T cell proliferation involved in immune response; toll-like receptor signaling pathway; positive regulation of transcription, DNA-templated; B cell activation; response to lipopolysaccharide; cellular response to metal ion; negative regulation of T cell anergy; defense response to virus; immune response; positive regulation of T cell proliferation; positive regulation of cell population proliferation; positive regulation of T-helper 2 cell differentiation; viral entry into host cell; viral process; toll-like receptor 3 signaling pathway; cellular response to lipopolysaccharide; T cell activation; positive regulation of activated T cell proliferation; phosphatidylinositol phosphate biosynthetic process; positive regulation of protein kinase B signaling; signal transduction; cell surface receptor signaling pathway; cytokine-mediated signaling pathway; negative regulation of T cell proliferation
Sources:Amigo / QuickGO
Orthologs
Databases	NCBI: entry; OMA: entry
Species	Human	Mouse
Entrez	942	12524
Ensembl	ENSG00000114013	ENSMUSG00000022901
UniProt	P42081	P42082
RefSeq (mRNA)	NM_176892; NM_001206924; NM_001206925; NM_006889; NM_175862	NM_019388
RefSeq (protein)	NP_001193853; NP_001193854; NP_008820; NP_787058; NP_795711	NP_062261
Location (UCSC)	Chr 3: 122.06 – 122.12 Mb	Chr 16: 36.42 – 36.49 Mb
PubMed search
- Wikidata
View/Edit Human	View/Edit Mouse

Cluster of differentiation 86 (also known as CD86 and B7-2) is a protein constitutively expressed on dendritic cells, Langerhans cells, macrophages, B-cells (including memory B-cells), and on other antigen-presenting cells. Along with CD80, CD86 provides costimulatory signals necessary for T cell activation and survival. Depending on the ligand bound, CD86 can signal for self-regulation and cell-cell association, or for attenuation of regulation and cell-cell disassociation.

The CD86 gene encodes a type I membrane protein that is a member of the immunoglobulin superfamily. Alternative splicing results in two transcript variants encoding different isoforms. Additional transcript variants have been described, but their full-length sequences have not been determined.

== Structure ==
CD86 belongs to the B7 family of the immunoglobulin superfamily. It is a 70 kDa glycoprotein made up of 329 amino acids. Both CD80 and CD86 share a conserved amino acid motif that forms their ligand binding domain. CD86 consists of Ig-like extracellular domains (one variable and one constant), a transmembrane region and a short cytoplasmic domain that is longer than that of CD80. costimulatory ligands CD80 and CD86 can be found on professional antigen presenting cells such as monocytes, dendritic cells, and even activated B-cells. They can also be induced on other cell types, for example T cells. CD86 expression is more abundant compared to CD80, and upon its activation is CD86 increased faster than CD80.

At the protein level, CD86 shares 25% identity with CD80 and both are coded on human chromosome 3q13.33q21.

== Role in co-stimulation, T-cell activation and inhibition ==
CD86 and CD80 bind as ligands to costimulatory molecule CD28 on the surface of all naïve T cells, and to the inhibitory receptor CTLA-4 (cytotoxic T-lymphocyte antigen-4, also known as CD152). CD28 and CTLA-4 have important, but opposite roles in the stimulation of T cells. Binding to CD28 promotes T cell responses, while binding to CTLA-4 inhibits them.

The interaction between CD86 (CD80) expressed on the surface of an antigen-presenting cell with CD28 on the surface of a mature, naive T-cell, is required for T-cell activation. To become activated, lymphocyte must engage both antigen and costimulatory ligand on the same antigen-presenting cell. T cell receptor (TCR) interacts with major histocompatibility complex (MHC) class II molecules, and this signalization must be accompanied by costimulatory signals, provided by a costimulatory ligand. These costimulatory signals are necessary to prevent anergy and are provided by the interaction between CD80/CD86 and CD28 costimulatory molecule.

This protein interaction is also essential for T lymphocytes to receive the full activation signal, which in turn leads to T cell differentiation and division, production of interleukin 2 and clonal expansion. Interaction between CD86 and CD28 activates mitogen-activated protein kinase and transcription factor nf-κB in the T-cell. These proteins up-regulate production of CD40L (used in B-cell activation), IL-21 and IL-21R (used for division/proliferation), and IL-2, among other cytokines. The interaction also regulates self-tolerance by supporting the homeostatis of CD4+CD25+ Tregulatory cell, also known as Tregs.

CTLA-4 is a coinhibitory molecule that is induced on activated T cells. Interaction between CTLA-4 and CD80/CD86 leads to delivery of negative signals into T cells and reduction of number of costimulatory molecules on the cell surface. It can also trigger a signaling pathway responsible for expression of enzyme IDO (indolamine-2,3-dioxygenase). This enzyme can metabolize amino acid tryptophan, which is an important component for successful proliferation and differentiation of T lymphocytes. IDO reduces the concentration of tryptophan in the environment, thereby suppressing the activation of conventional T cells, while also promoting the function of regulatory T cells.

Both CD80 and CD86 bind CTLA-4 with higher affinity than CD28. This allows CTLA-4 to outcompete CD28 for CD80/CD86 binding. Between CD80 and CD86, CD80 appears to have a higher affinity for both CTLA-4 and CD28 than CD86. This suggest that CD80 is more potent ligand than CD86, but studies using CD80 and CD86 knockout mice have shown that CD86 is more important in T cell activation than CD80.

== Treg mediation ==
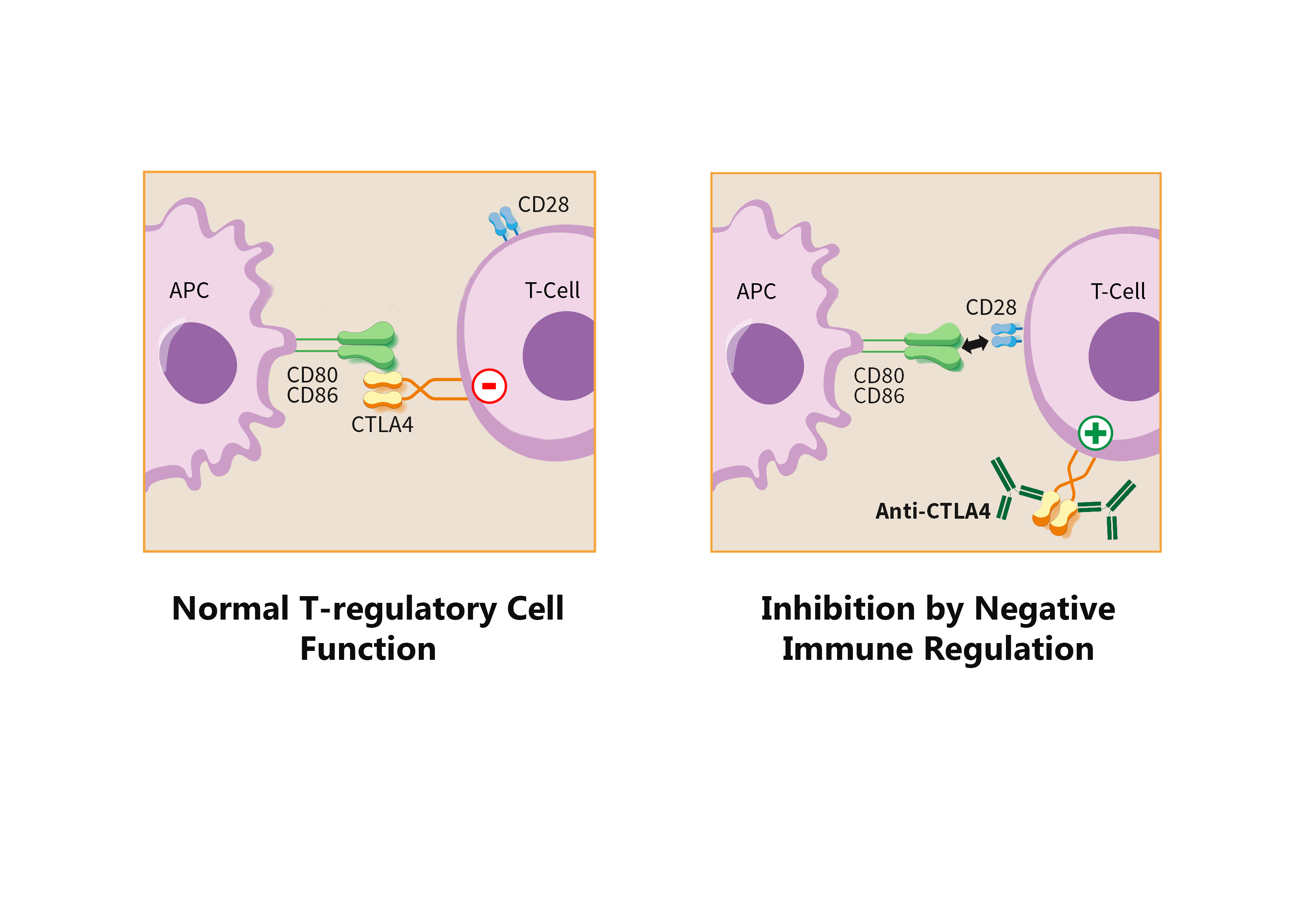
CTLA-4 inhibits CD86 - CD28 binding when active on Tregulatory cells

Pathways in the B7:CD28 family have key roles in the regulation of T cell activation and tolerance. Their negative second signals are responsible for downregulation of cell responses. For all these reasons are these pathways considered as therapeutic targets.

Regulatory T cells produce CTLA-4. Due to its interaction with CD80/CD86, Tregs can compete with conventional T cells and block their costimulatory signals. Treg expression of CTLA-4 can effectively downregulate both CD80 and CD86 on APCs, suppress the immune response and lead to increased anergy. Since CTLA-4 binds to CD86 with higher affinity than CD28, the co-stimulation necessary for proper T-cell activation is also affected. It was shown in a work from Sagurachi group that Treg cells were able to downregulate CD80 and CD86, but not CD40 or MHC class II on DC in a way that was adhesion dependent. Downregulation was blocked by anti-CTLA-4 antibody and was cancelled if Treg cells were CTLA-4 deficient.

When bound to CTLA-4, CD86 can be removed from the surface of an APC and onto the Treg cell in a process called trogocytosis. Blocking this process with anti-CTLA-4 antibodies is useful for a specific type of cancer immunotherapy called "Cancer therapy by inhibition of negative immune regulation". Japanese immunologist Tasuku Honjo and American immunologist James P. Allison won the Nobel Prize in Physiology or Medicine in 2018 for their work on this topic.

== Role in pathology ==
Roles of both CD80 and CD86 are studied in context of many pathologies. Selective inhibition of costimulatory inhibitors was examined in a model of allergic pulmonary inflammation and airway hyper-responsiveness (AHR). Since initial host response to Staphylococcus aureus, especially the immune response based on T cells, is a contributing factor in the pathogenesis of acute pneumonia, role of the CD80/CD86 pathway in pathogenesis was investigated. The costimulatory molecules were also investigated in context of Bronchial Astma, Treg in cancer, and immunotherapy. Several hematological tumors, mainly of B-cell origin, express surface CD86 or secrete its soluble form; however, its role in tumor cell survival is controversial. CD86 can activate regulatory T cells, which exert an immunosuppressive effect that contributes to the survival of tumor cells, or it can inhibit of effector T cells. In contrast, certain treatments increase CD86 expression, facilitating the antitumor T cell response through the activation of effector T cells.

== See also ==
- Cluster of differentiation
- CD80
- CD28
- CTLA-4
- List of human clusters of differentiation for a list of CD molecules
