= TNFRSF18 =

Protein found in humans

Identifiers
- Aliases: TNFRSF18, AITR, CD357, GITR, GITR-D, tumor necrosis factor receptor superfamily member 18, TNF receptor superfamily member 18, ENERGEN
- External IDs: OMIM: 603905; MGI: 894675; GeneCards: TNFRSF18

Gene location (Human)
Chr.	Chromosome 1 (human)
Band	1p36.33	Start	1,203,508 bp
Band	1p36.33	End	1,206,592 bp

Gene location (Mouse)
Chr.	Chromosome 4 (mouse)
Band	4|4 E2	Start	156,110,621 bp
Band	4|4 E2	End	156,113,352 bp
RNA expression pattern
Bgee	Human / Mouse (ortholog); Top expressed in: skin of abdomen; granulocyte; skin of leg; cartilage tissue; nasal epithelium; testicle; skin of arm; olfactory zone of nasal mucosa; tibialis anterior muscle; mucosa of transverse colon / Top expressed in: neural layer of retina; thymus; blood; lip; granulocyte; genital tubercle; spleen; tail of embryo; mesenteric lymph nodes; zone of skin; More reference expression data
BioGPS	n/a
Gene ontology
Molecular function	tumor necrosis factor-activated receptor activity; protein binding
Cellular component	integral component of membrane; extracellular region; plasma membrane; integral component of plasma membrane; membrane
Biological process	apoptotic process; multicellular organism development; response to lipopolysaccharide; inflammatory response; tumor necrosis factor-mediated signaling pathway; regulation of cell population proliferation; immune response; signal transduction; positive regulation of leukocyte migration; negative regulation of apoptotic process; regulation of apoptotic process; apoptotic signaling pathway; positive regulation of tyrosine phosphorylation of STAT protein; regulation of regulatory T cell differentiation; positive regulation of cell adhesion
Sources:Amigo / QuickGO
Orthologs
Databases	NCBI: entry; OMA: entry
Species	Human	Mouse
Entrez	8784	21936
Ensembl	ENSG00000186891	ENSMUSG00000041954
UniProt	Q9Y5U5	O35714
RefSeq (mRNA)	NM_148902; NM_004195; NM_148901	NM_009400; NM_021985
RefSeq (protein)	NP_004186; NP_683699; NP_683700	NP_033426; NP_068820
Location (UCSC)	Chr 1: 1.2 – 1.21 Mb	Chr 4: 156.11 – 156.11 Mb
PubMed search
- Wikidata
View/Edit Human	View/Edit Mouse

Tumor necrosis factor receptor superfamily member 18 (TNFRSF18), also known as glucocorticoid-induced TNFR-related protein (GITR) or CD357. GITR is encoded and tnfrsf18 gene at chromosome 4 in mice. GITR is type I transmembrane protein and is described in 4 different isoforms. GITR human orthologue, also called activation-inducible TNFR family receptor (AITR), is encoded by the TNFRSF18 gene at chromosome 1.

== Tissue distribution ==
GITR is constitutively expressed on CD25+CD4+ regulatory T cells and its expression is upregulated on all T cell subsets after activation. GITR is also expressed on murine neutrophils and NK cells.

== Structure ==
GITR is a member of TNFR superfamily and shares high homology in cytoplasmic domain, characterized with cysteine pseudo-repeats, with other members of TNFRSF, such as CD137, OX40 or CD27.

== Function ==
GITR interacts with its ligand (GITRL) that is expressed on antigen-presenting cells (APC) and endothelial cells.

=== AITR ===
Human activation-inducible tumor necrosis factor receptor (AITR) and its ligand, AITRL, are important costimulatory molecules in the pathogenesis of autoimmune diseases. Despite the importance of these costimulatory molecules in autoimmune disease, their role in the autoimmune reaction to herniated disc fragments has yet to be explored.

=== GITR ===
GITR was identified as a new member of the TNF receptor superfamily, by comparing gene expression in untreated and DEX-treated murine T-cell lines.

GITR is co-stimulatory surface receptor for T cells and after interaction with GITRL maintain T cell activation, proliferation, cytokine production, and rescue T cells from anti-CD3-induced apoptosis. GITR can be used as Treg marker and its signaling abrogates the suppressive function of regulatory T cells. Also, GITR plays role in Treg development, as it is expressed already at CD4+CD25+Foxp3- Treg progenitors.

GITR^{-/-} mice has no developmental problem and are fertile. They have complete block in anti-CD3-induced T cell activation and decrease in regulatory T cells progenitors. After infection challenge, GTIR^{-/-} mice developed less inflammation than WT littermates.

=== Signaling ===
GITR does not have any enzymatic activity and signaling is propagated via recruiting TRAF-family members, specifically TRAF1, TRAF2 and TRAF5, to the GITR-signaling complex. The signaling is then mediated through NF-kB and MAPK pathways. There is an evidence that GITR has unique role for CD8+ and CD4+ T cells. GITR signaling lowers the threshold for CD28 signaling on CD8+ T cells or induces expression of CD137 on CD8+ memory T cells. For CD4+ regulatory T cells, GITR signaling promotes their expansion, inhibits Treg suppressive capacity and promotes resistance of effector T cells to Treg suppression.

== Clinical significance ==
GITR is in high interest as one of the immune checkpoint molecules that have potential in cancer treatment. GITR signaling can promote antitumor and anti-infective immune response, but also can be a driver of autoimmune diseases. Different response to GITR signaling rely on the GITR expression on different immune cell types. How GITR signaling is modulated in the different cells remains unknown. GITR agonistic antibodies are in the clinical trials as activators of effector CD8 T cells, while decreasing number of circulating suppressive regulatory T cells. Limited response to GITR agonistic antibodies is enhanced in combination with anti-PD-1 or anti-CTLA-4 therapies.

GITR^{-/-} mice in pancreatitis model have reduced IkBα and decreased expression of NF-kB p65 protein in pancreatic tissue, and also increased pro-apoptotic markers (e.g. Bax) and decreased anti-apoptotic markers (e.g. Bcl-2).

=== Atherosclerosis ===
Atherosclerosis is autoinflammatory disease that belongs to the group of cardiovascular diseases (CVD). In atherosclerosis progression, plaques with modified low density lipoprotein (LDL) are formed. GITR expression was detected in plaques macrophages and T cells. Moreover, soluble GITR (sGITR) was present in patient's plasma. GITR potentially might be used as a biomarker of CVD patients, as its plaque expression and levels in plasma can distinguish the CVD patients from healthy controls.

== Animal models ==
Asthma model: GITR activation drives an infiltration of eosinophils to the lungs and induces production of cytokines. Model of arthritis: GITR activation increase numbers of Th17 cells in secondary lymphoid organs and stimulate cytokine production. Model of atopic dermatitis: GITR-GITRL pathway activation supports the production of attractants of regulatory T cells (CCL17 and CCL27) and promotes production of Th2-induced cytokines. Inhibition of GITR-GITRL pathway potentially may decrease a severity of different diseases, as asthma, arthritis or atopic dermatitis.
