= Cytotoxic T-lymphocyte associated protein 4 =

Protein found in humans

CTLA4
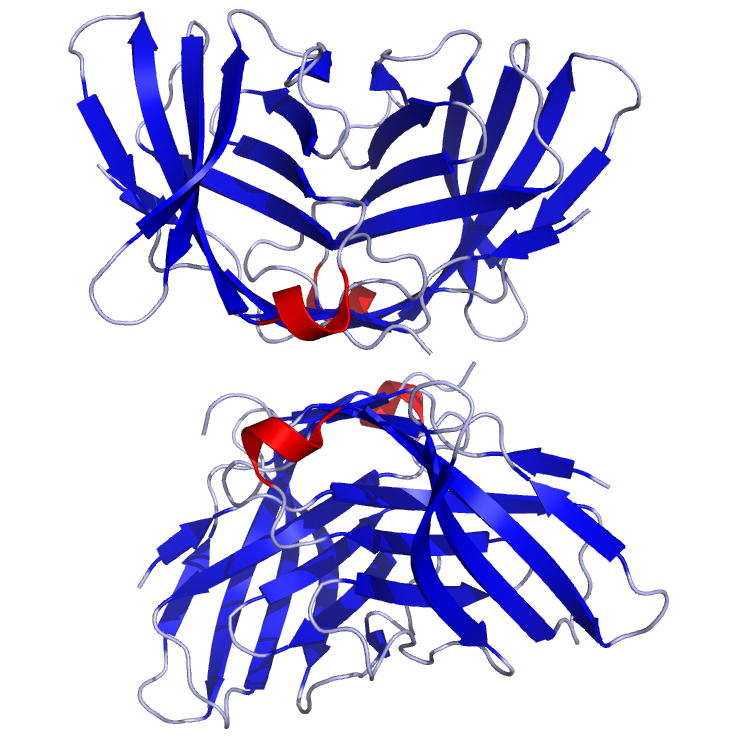

Identifiers
- Aliases: CTLA4, ALPS5, CD, CD152, CELIAC3, CTLA-4, GRD4, GSE, IDDM12, cytotoxic T-lymphocyte associated protein 4
- External IDs: OMIM: 123890; MGI: 88556; GeneCards: CTLA4
Available structures
PDB	Ortholog search: PDBe RCSB
PDB	List of PDB id codes 3OSK, 1AH1, 1H6E, 1I85, 1I8L, 2X44, 3BX7

Gene location (Human)
Chr.	Chromosome 2 (human)
Band	2q33.2	Start	203,853,888 bp
Band	2q33.2	End	203,873,965 bp

Gene location (Mouse)
Chr.	Chromosome 1 (mouse)
Band	1 C2|1 30.58 cM	Start	60,926,159 bp
Band	1 C2|1 30.58 cM	End	60,954,991 bp
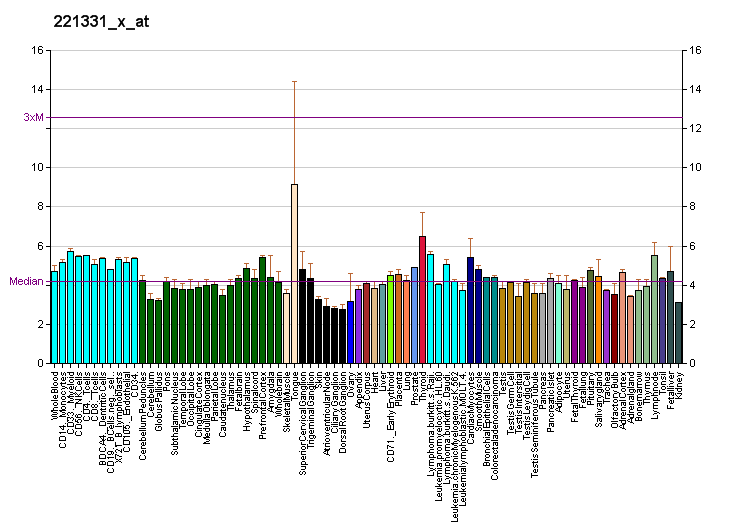
RNA expression pattern
Bgee	Human / Mouse (ortholog); Top expressed in: lymph node; appendix; buccal mucosa cell; gonad; pancreatic epithelial cell; testicle; granulocyte; pancreatic ductal cell; superficial temporal artery; gallbladder / Top expressed in: secondary oocyte; zygote; thymus; primary oocyte; spleen; ileum; zone of skin; jejunum; esophagus; colon; More reference expression data
BioGPS	More reference expression data
Gene ontology
Molecular function	protein binding
Cellular component	perinuclear region of cytoplasm; integral component of membrane; clathrin-coated endocytic vesicle; plasma membrane; Golgi apparatus; membrane; external side of plasma membrane; protein complex involved in cell adhesion; integral component of plasma membrane
Biological process	B cell receptor signaling pathway; T cell costimulation; negative regulation of B cell proliferation; adaptive immune response; negative regulation of regulatory T cell differentiation; immune response; cellular response to DNA damage stimulus; immune system process; positive regulation of apoptotic process; negative regulation of immune response; negative regulation of T cell proliferation; regulation of regulatory T cell differentiation; regulation of T cell proliferation; T cell receptor signaling pathway
Sources:Amigo / QuickGO
Orthologs
Databases	NCBI: entry; OMA: entry
Species	Human	Mouse
Entrez	1493	12477
Ensembl	ENSG00000163599	ENSMUSG00000026011
UniProt	P16410	P09793
RefSeq (mRNA)	NM_001037631; NM_005214	NM_001281976; NM_009843
RefSeq (protein)	NP_001032720; NP_005205	NP_001268905; NP_033973
Location (UCSC)	Chr 2: 203.85 – 203.87 Mb	Chr 1: 60.93 – 60.95 Mb
PubMed search
- Wikidata
View/Edit Human	View/Edit Mouse

Cytotoxic T-lymphocyte associated protein 4 (CTLA-4), also known as CD152 (cluster of differentiation 152), is a protein receptor that functions as an immune checkpoint and downregulates immune responses. CTLA-4 is constitutively expressed in regulatory T cells but only upregulated in conventional T cells after activation – a phenomenon which is particularly notable in cancers. It acts as an "off" switch when bound to CD80 or CD86 on the surface of antigen-presenting cells. It is encoded by the CTLA4 gene in humans, and by the Ctla4 gene in mice.

== History ==
CTLA-4 was first identified in 1991 as a second receptor for the T cell costimulation ligand B7. In November 1995, the labs of Tak Wah Mak and Arlene Sharpe independently published their findings on the discovery of the function of CTLA-4 as a negative regulator of T-cell activation, by knocking out the gene in mice. Previous studies from several labs had used methods which could not definitively define the function of CTLA-4, and were contradictory.

== Function ==
CTLA-4 is a member of the immunoglobulin superfamily that is expressed by activated T cells and transmits an inhibitory signal to T cells. CTLA-4 is homologous to the T-cell co-stimulatory protein, CD28, and both molecules bind to CD80 and CD86, also called B7-1 and B7-2 respectively, on antigen-presenting cells. CTLA-4 binds CD80 and CD86 with greater affinity and avidity than CD28 thus enabling it to outcompete CD28 for its ligands. CTLA-4 transmits an inhibitory signal to T cells, whereas CD28 transmits a stimulatory signal. CTLA-4 is also found in regulatory T cells (Tregs) and contributes to their inhibitory function. T cell activation through the T cell receptor and CD28 leads to increased expression of CTLA-4.

The mechanism by which CTLA-4 acts in T cells remains somewhat controversial. Biochemical evidence suggested that CTLA-4 recruits a phosphatase to the T cell receptor (TCR), thus attenuating the signal. This work remains unconfirmed in the literature since its first publication. More recent work has suggested that CTLA-4 may function in vivo by capturing and removing CD80 and CD86 from the membranes of antigen-presenting cells, thus making these unavailable for triggering of CD28.

In addition to that, it has been found that dendritic cell (DC) - Treg interaction causes sequestration of Fascin-1, an actin-bundling protein essential for immunological synapse formation and skews Fascin-1–dependent actin polarization in antigen presenting DCs toward the Treg cell adhesion zone. Although it is reversible upon T regulatory cell disengagement, this sequestration of essential cytoskeletal components causes a lethargic state of DCs, leading to reduced T cell priming. This suggests Treg-mediated immune suppression is a multi-step process. In addition to CTLA-4 CD80/CD86 interaction, fascin-dependent polarization of the cytoskeleton towards DC-Treg immune synapse may play a pivotal role.

CTLA-4 may also function via modulation of cell motility and/or signaling through PI3 kinase. Early multiphoton microscopy studies observing T-cell motility in intact lymph nodes appeared to give evidence for the so-called 'reverse-stop signaling model'. In this model CTLA-4 reverses the TCR-induced 'stop signal' needed for firm contact between T cells and antigen-presenting cells (APCs). However, those studies compared CTLA-4 positive cells, which are predominantly regulatory cells and are at least partially activated, with CTLA-4 negative naive T cells. The disparity of these cells in multiple regards may explain some of these results. Other groups who have analyzed the effect of antibodies to CTLA-4 in vivo have concluded little or no effect upon motility in the context of anergic T-cells. Antibodies to CTLA-4 may exert additional effects when used in vivo, by binding and thereby depleting regulatory T cells.

== Structure ==
The protein contains an extracellular V domain, a transmembrane domain, and a cytoplasmic tail. Alternate splice variants, encoding different isoforms, have been characterized. The membrane-bound isoform functions as a homodimer interconnected by a disulfide bond, while the soluble isoform functions as a monomer. The intracellular domain is similar to that of CD28, in that it has no intrinsic catalytic activity and contains one YVKM motif able to bind PI3K, PP2A and SHP-2 and one proline-rich motif able to bind SH3 containing proteins. The first role of CTLA-4 in inhibiting T cell responses seem to be directly via SHP-2 and PP2A dephosphorylation of TCR-proximal signalling proteins such as CD3 and LAT. CTLA-4 can also affect signalling indirectly via competing with CD28 for CD80/86 binding. CTLA-4 can also bind PI3K, although the importance and results of this interaction are uncertain.

== Clinical significance ==
Variants in this gene have been associated with Type 1 diabetes, Graves' disease, Hashimoto's thyroiditis, celiac disease, systemic lupus erythematosus, thyroid-associated orbitopathy, primary biliary cirrhosis and other autoimmune diseases.

Polymorphisms of the CTLA-4 gene are associated with autoimmune diseases such as rheumatoid arthritis, autoimmune thyroid disease and multiple sclerosis, though this association is often weak. In systemic lupus erythematosus (SLE), the splice variant sCTLA-4 is found to be aberrantly produced and found in the serum of patients with active SLE.

=== Germline haploinsufficiency ===
Germline haploinsufficiency of CTLA-4 leads to CTLA-4 deficiency or CHAI disease (CTLA4 haploinsufficiency with autoimmune infiltration), a rare genetic disorder of the immune system. This may cause a dysregulation of the immune system and may result in lymphoproliferation, autoimmunity, hypogammaglobulinemia, recurrent infections, and may slightly increase one's risk of lymphoma. CTLA-4 mutations have first been described by a collaboration between the groups of Dr. Gulbu Uzel, Dr. Steven Holland, and Dr. Michael Lenardo from the National Institute of Allergy and Infectious Disease, Dr. Thomas Fleisher from the NIH Clinical Center at the National Institutes of Health, and their collaborators in 2014. In the same year a collaboration between the groups of Dr. Bodo Grimbacher, Dr. Shimon Sakaguchi, Dr. Lucy Walker and Dr. David Sansom and their collaborators described a similar phenotype.

CTLA-4 mutations are inherited in an autosomal dominant manner. This means a person only needs one abnormal gene from one parent. The one normal copy is not enough to compensate for the one abnormal copy. Dominant inheritance means most families with CTLA-4 mutations have affected relatives in each generation on the side of the family with the mutation.

==== Clinical and laboratory manifestations ====
Symptomatic patients with CTLA-4 mutations are characterized by an immune dysregulation syndrome including extensive T cell infiltration in a number of organs, including the gut, lungs, bone marrow, central nervous system and kidneys. Most patients have diarrhea or enteropathy. Lymphadenopathy and hepatosplenomegaly are also common, as is autoimmunity. The organs affected by autoimmunity vary but include thrombocytopenia, hemolytic anemia, thyroiditis, type I diabetes, psoriasis, and arthritis. Respiratory infections are also common. Importantly, the clinical presentations and disease courses are variable with some individuals severely affected, whereas others show little manifestation of disease. This "variable expressivity", even within the same family, can be striking and may be explained by differences in lifestyle, exposure to pathogens, treatment efficacy, or other genetic modifiers. This condition is described to have incomplete penetrance of disease. Penetrance is said to be incomplete when some individuals fail to express the trait and seem completely asymptomatic, even though they carry the allele. The penetrance is estimated to be about 60%.

The clinical symptoms are caused by abnormalities of the immune system. Most patients develop reduced levels of at least one immunoglobulin isotype, and have low CTLA-4 protein expression in T regulatory cells, hyperactivation of effector T cells, low switched memory B cells, and progressive loss of circulating B cells.

==== Treatment ====
Once a diagnosis is made, the treatment is based on an individual's clinical condition and may include standard management for autoimmunity and immunoglobulin deficiencies. A study reported in 2016 treated a Korean CHAI disease patient with abatacept, which is a fusion protein of CTLA-4 and an antibody, and was able to control immune activity and improve patient symptoms. Regular administration of abatacept improved the patient's severe anemia and diarrhea (3L/day) and brought 3-year-long hospitalization to an end.

=== Agonists to reduce immune activity ===
The comparatively higher binding affinity of CTLA-4 than that of CD28 has made CTLA-4 a potential therapy for autoimmune diseases. Fusion proteins of CTLA-4 and antibodies (CTLA4-Ig) have been used in clinical trials for rheumatoid arthritis. The fusion protein CTLA4-Ig is commercially available as Orencia (abatacept). A second generation form of CTLA4-Ig known as belatacept was recently approved by the FDA based on favorable results from the randomized Phase III BENEFIT (Belatacept Evaluation of Nephroprotection and Efficacy as First Line Immunosuppression Trial) study. It was approved for renal transplantation in patients that are sensitized to Epstein–Barr virus (EBV).

=== Antagonists to increase immune activity ===
Conversely, there is increasing interest in the possible therapeutic benefits of blocking CTLA-4 (using antagonistic antibodies against CTLA such as ipilimumab—FDA approved for melanoma in 2011—as a means of inhibiting immune system tolerance to tumours and thereby providing a potentially useful immunotherapy strategy for patients with cancer). This therapy was the first approved immune checkpoint blockade therapy. Another is tremelimumab.

The 2018 Nobel Prize in Physiology or Medicine was awarded to James P. Allison and Tasuku Honjo "for their discovery of cancer therapy by inhibition of negative immune regulation".

== Interactions ==
CTLA-4 has been shown to interact with:

- AP2M1,
- CD80,
- CD86,
- SHP-2, and
- PPP2R5A.
