= CD28 =

Mammalian protein found in humans

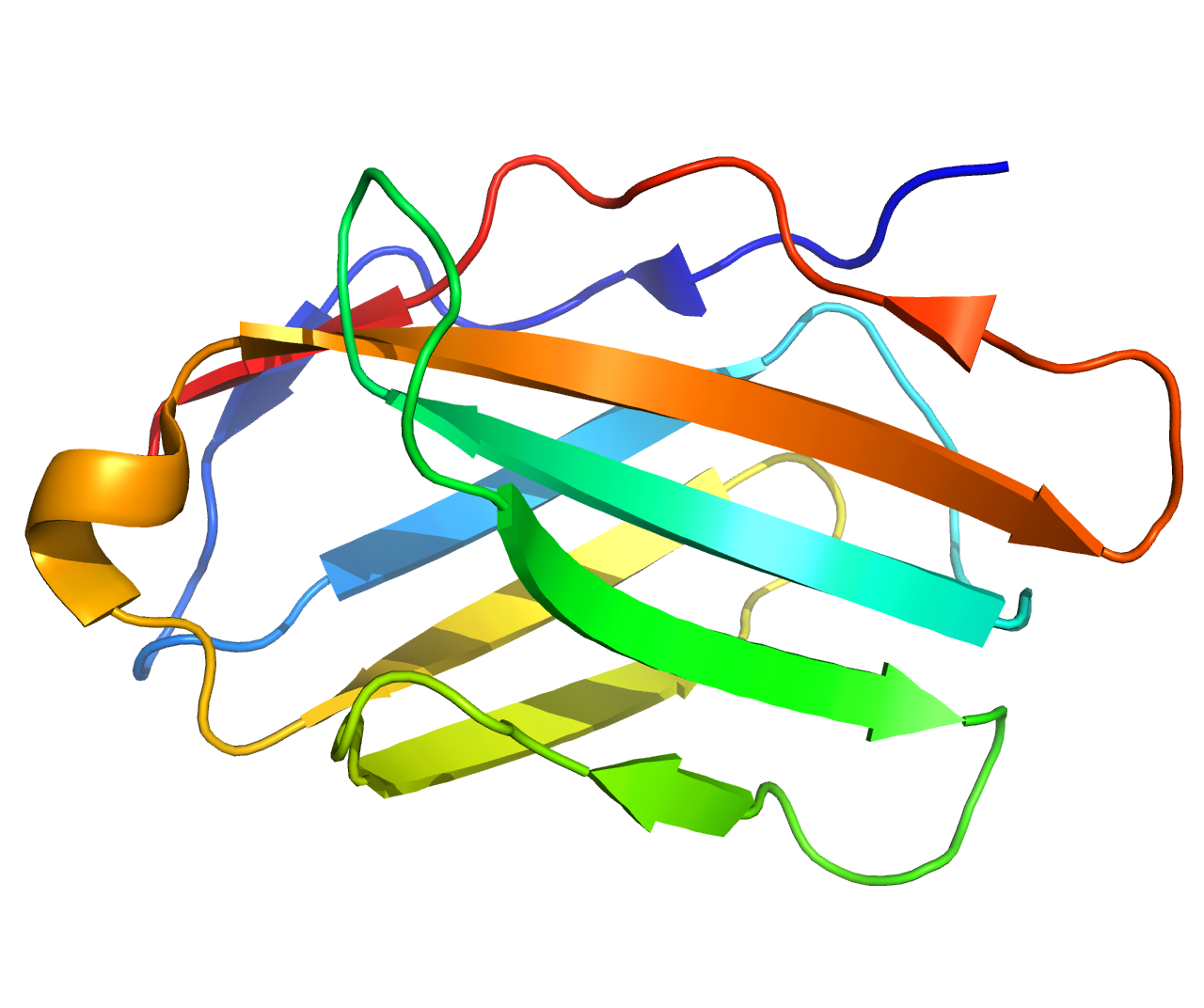

Identifiers
- Aliases: CD28, Tp44, CD28 molecule
- External IDs: OMIM: 186760; MGI: 88327; GeneCards: CD28
Available structures
PDB	Ortholog search: PDBe RCSB
PDB	List of PDB id codes 1YJD, 3WA4, 5AUL

Gene location (Human)
Chr.	Chromosome 2 (human)
Band	2q33.2	Start	203,706,475 bp
Band	2q33.2	End	203,738,912 bp

Gene location (Mouse)
Chr.	Chromosome 1 (mouse)
Band	1 C2|1 30.52 cM	Start	60,755,959 bp
Band	1 C2|1 30.52 cM	End	60,812,518 bp
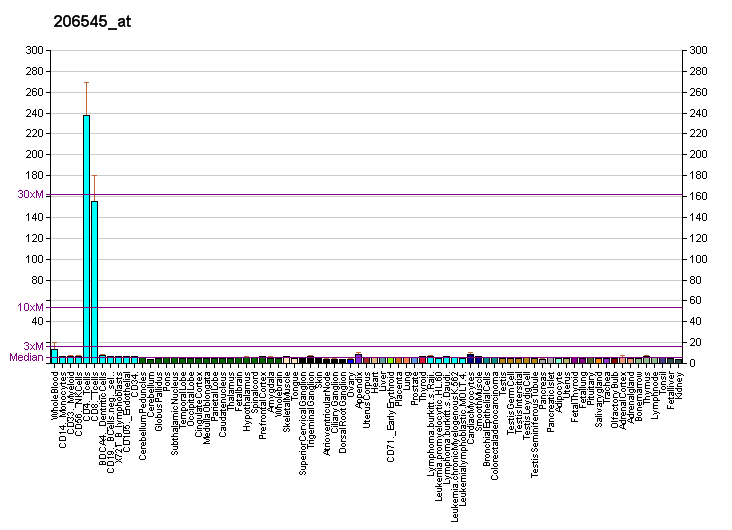

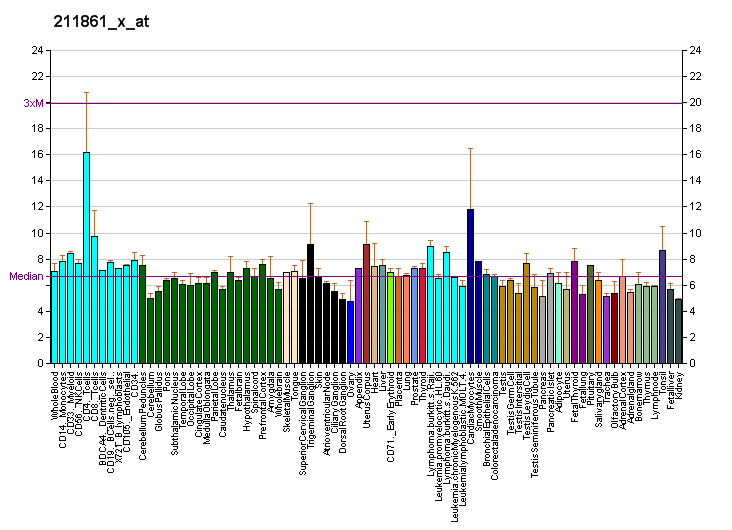

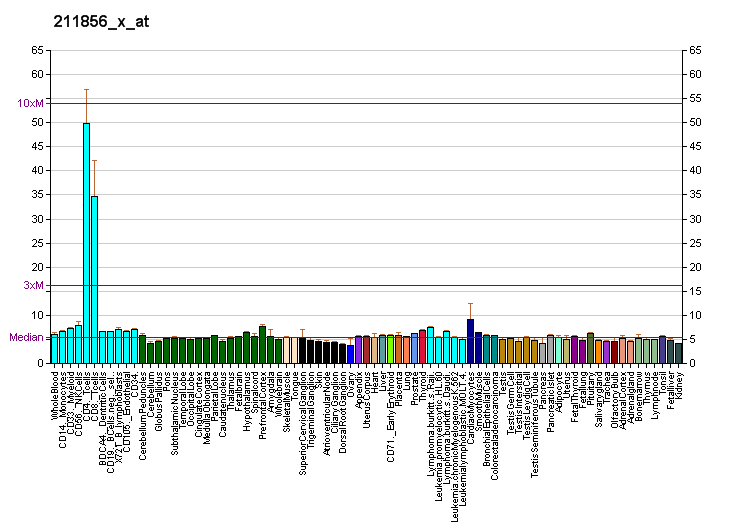
RNA expression pattern
Bgee	Human / Mouse (ortholog); Top expressed in: lymph node; appendix; blood; granulocyte; epithelium of colon; gallbladder; amniotic fluid; thymus; tonsil; spleen / Top expressed in: thymus; blood; spleen; vastus lateralis muscle; mesenteric lymph nodes; triceps brachii muscle; temporal muscle; subcutaneous adipose tissue; sternocleidomastoid muscle; morula; More reference expression data
BioGPS	More reference expression data
Gene ontology
Molecular function	coreceptor activity; protease binding; protein binding; identical protein binding; protein kinase binding; phosphatidylinositol-4,5-bisphosphate 3-kinase activity
Cellular component	integral component of membrane; cytosol; membrane; plasma membrane; integral component of plasma membrane; immunological synapse; external side of plasma membrane; cell surface; protein complex involved in cell adhesion
Biological process	regulatory T cell differentiation; regulation of regulatory T cell differentiation; T cell costimulation; mitigation of host defenses by virus; positive regulation of translation; negative regulation of gene expression; negative thymic T cell selection; cell surface receptor signaling pathway; positive regulation of gene expression; humoral immune response; positive regulation of T cell proliferation; positive regulation of alpha-beta T cell proliferation; immune response; apoptotic signaling pathway; positive regulation of phosphatidylinositol 3-kinase signaling; positive regulation of isotype switching to IgG isotypes; positive regulation of viral genome replication; T cell receptor signaling pathway; positive regulation of mitotic nuclear division; positive regulation of inflammatory response to antigenic stimulus; positive regulation of transcription by RNA polymerase II; positive regulation of interleukin-10 production; phosphatidylinositol phosphate biosynthetic process; positive regulation of interleukin-4 production; positive regulation of protein kinase B signaling; T cell activation; negative regulation of apoptotic process; regulation of T cell proliferation; immune system process
Sources:Amigo / QuickGO
Orthologs
Databases	NCBI: entry; OMA: entry
Species	Human	Mouse
Entrez	940	12487
Ensembl	ENSG00000178562	ENSMUSG00000026012
UniProt	P10747	P31041
RefSeq (mRNA)	NM_001243077; NM_001243078; NM_006139	NM_007642
RefSeq (protein)	NP_001230006; NP_001230007; NP_006130	NP_031668
Location (UCSC)	Chr 2: 203.71 – 203.74 Mb	Chr 1: 60.76 – 60.81 Mb
PubMed search
- Wikidata
View/Edit Human	View/Edit Mouse

CD28 (cluster of differentiation 28) is a protein expressed on T cells that provides essential co-stimulatory signals required for T cell activation and survival. When T cells are stimulated through CD28 in conjunction with the T-cell receptor (TCR), it enhances the production of various interleukins, particularly IL-6. CD28 serves as a receptor for CD80 (B7.1) and CD86 (B7.2), proteins found on antigen-presenting cells (APCs).

CD28 is the only B7 receptor consistently expressed on naive T cells. In the absence of CD28:B7 interaction, a naive T cell's TCR engagement with an MHC:antigen complex leads to anergy. CD28 is also expressed on stromal cells of the bone marrow, plasma cells, neutrophils, and eosinophils, although its function in these cells is not fully understood.

Typically, CD28 is expressed on about 50% of cytotoxic T cells (CD8+) and more than 80% of helper T cells (CD4+) in humans. However, some T cells lose CD28 expression during activation, particularly antigen-experienced T cells, which can be re-activated independently of CD28. These CD28^{−} T cells are often antigen-specific, terminally differentiated, and categorized as memory T cells (TMs). The proportion of CD28^{−} T cells increases with age.

As a homodimer with Ig domains, CD28 binds B7 molecules on APCs, promoting T cell proliferation, differentiation, growth factor production, and the expression of anti-apoptotic proteins. While CD28 is crucial for T cell activation, particularly in initial immune responses, some antigen-experienced T cells can function without it, marking their differentiation into cytotoxic memory cells.

== Signaling ==
CD28 possesses an intracellular domain with several residues that are critical for its effective signaling. The YMNM motif beginning at tyrosine 170 in particular is critical for the recruitment of SH2-domain containing proteins, especially PI3K, Grb2 and Gads. The Y170 residue is important for the induction of Bcl-xL via mTOR and enhancement of IL-2 transcription via PKCθ, but has no effect on proliferation and results a slight reduction in IL-2 production. The N172 residue (as part of the YMNM) is important for the binding of Grb2 and Gads and seems to be able to induce IL-2 mRNA stability but not NF-κB translocation. The induction of NF-κB seems to be much more dependent on the binding of Gads to both the YMNM and the two proline-rich motifs within the molecule. However, mutation of the final amino acid of the motif, M173, which is unable to bind PI3K but is able to bind Grb2 and Gads, gives little NF-κB or IL-2, suggesting that those Grb2 and Gads are unable to compensate for the loss of PI3K. IL-2 transcription appears to have two stages; a Y170-dependent, PI3K-dependent initial phase which allows transcription and a PI3K-independent second phase which is dependent on formation of an immune synapse, which results in enhancement of IL-2 mRNA stability. Both are required for full production of IL-2.

CD28 also contains two proline-rich motifs that are able to bind SH3-containing proteins. Itk and Tec are able to bind to the N-terminal of these two motifs which immediately succeeds the Y170 YMNM; Lck binds the C-terminal. Both Itk and Lck are able to phosphorylate the tyrosine residues which then allow binding of SH2 containing proteins to CD28. Binding of Tec to CD28 enhances IL-2 production, dependent on binding of its SH3 and PH domains to CD28 and PIP3 respectively. The C-terminal proline-rich motif in CD28 is important for bringing Lck and lipid rafts into the immune synapse via filamin-A. Mutation of the two prolines within the C-terminal motif results in reduced proliferation and IL-2 production but normal induction of Bcl-xL. Phosphorylation of a tyrosine within the PYAP motif (Y191 in the mature human CD28) forms a high affinity-binding site for the SH2 domain of the src kinase Lck which in turn binds to the serine kinase PKC-θ.

== Structure ==
The structure of the human CD28 protein contains 220 amino acids, encoded by a gene consisting of four exons. It is a glycosylated, disulfide-linked homodimer of 44 kDa expressed on the cell surface. The structure contains paired domains of the V-set immunoglobulin superfamilies (IgSF). These domains are linked to individual transmembrane domains and cytoplasmic domains that contain critical signaling motifs. As CTLA4, CD28 share highly similar CDR3-analogous loops. In the CD28-CD80 complex, the two CD80 molecules converge such that their membrane proximal domains collide sterically, despite the availability of both ligand binding sites for CD28.

== CD28 family members ==
CD28 belongs into group members of a subfamily of costimulatory molecules that are characterized by an extracellular variable immunoglobulin-like domain. Members of this subfamily also include homologous receptors ICOS, CTLA4, PD1, PD1H, and BTLA. Nevertheless, only CD28 is expressed constitutively on mouse T cells, whereas ICOS and CTLA4 are induce by T cells receptor stimulation and in response to cytokines such as IL-2. CD28 and CTLA4 are very homologous and compete for the same ligand – CD80 and CD86. CTLA4 binds CD80 and CD86 always stronger than CD28, which allows CTLA4 to compete with CD28 for ligand and suppress effector T cells responses. But it was shown that CD28 and CTLA4 have opposite effect on the T cells stimulation. CD28 acts as a activator and CTLA4 acts as inhibitor. ICOS and CD28 are also closely related genes, but they cannot substitute from one another in function. The opposing roles of CD28 and ICOS compared to CTLA4 cause that these receptors act as a rheostat for the immune response through competitive pro- and anti-inflammatory effects.

== As a drug target ==
The drug TGN1412, which was produced by the German biotech company TeGenero, and unexpectedly caused multiple organ failure in trials, is a superagonist of CD28. Unfortunately, it is often ignored that the same receptors also exist on cells other than lymphocytes. CD28 has also been found to stimulate eosinophil granulocytes where its ligation with anti-CD28 leads to the release of IL-2, IL4, IL-13 and IFN-γ.

It is known that CD28 and CTL4 may be critical regulators of autoimmune diseases in mouse model. But there is less data from patients on the role of CD28 in human diseases.

Other potential drugs in pre-clinical development are agonist CD28 aptamers with immunostimulatory properties in a mouse tumor model, a monoclonal anti-CD28 Fab´ antibody FR104, or an octapeptide AB103, which prevents CD28 homodimerization.

== Interactions ==
CD28 has been shown to interact with:

- GRAP2,
- Grb2, and
- PIK3R1.

== See also ==
- List of human clusters of differentiation
