= Tolerogenic dendritic cell =

Tolerogenic dendritic cells (a. k. a. tol-DCs, tDCs, or DCregs) are heterogenous pool of dendritic cells with immuno-suppressive properties, priming immune system into tolerogenic state against various antigens. These tolerogenic effects are mostly mediated through regulation of T cells such as inducing T cell anergy, T cell apoptosis and induction of Tregs. Tol-DCs also affect local micro-environment toward tolerogenic state by producing anti-inflammatory cytokines.

Tol-DCs are not lineage specific and their immune-suppressive functions is due to their state of activation and/or differentiation. Generally, properties of all types of dendritic cells can be highly affected by local micro-environment such as presence of pro or anti-inflammatory cytokines, therefore tolerogenic properties of tol-DCs are often context dependant and can be even eventually overridden into pro-inflammatory phenotype.

Tolerogenic DCs present a potential strategy for treatment of autoimmune diseases, allergic diseases and transplant rejections. Moreover, Ag-specific tolerance in humans can be induced in vivo via vaccination with Ag-pulsed ex vivo generated tolerogenic DCs. For that reason, tolerogenic DCs are an important promising therapeutic tool.

== Dendritic cells ==
Dendritic cells (DCs) were first discovered and described in 1973 by Ralph M. Steinman. They represent a bridge between innate and adaptive immunity and play a key role in the regulation of initiation of immune responses. DCs populate almost all body surfaces and they do not kill the pathogens directly, they utilize and subsequently degrade antigens to peptides by their proteolytic activity. After that, they present these peptides in complexes together with their MHC molecules on their cell surface. DCs are also the only cell type which can activate naïve T cells and induce antigen-specific immune responses.

Therefore, their role is crucially important in balance between tolerance and immune response.

== Tolerogenic dendritic cells ==
Tolerogenic DCs are essential in maintenance of central and peripheral tolerance through induction of T cell clonal deletion, T cell anergy and generation and activation of regulatory T (Treg) cells. For that reason, tolerogenic DCs are possible candidates for specific cellular therapy for treatment of allergic diseases, autoimmune diseases (e.g. type 1 diabetes, multiple sclerosis, rheumatoid arthritis) or transplant rejections.

Tolerogenic DCs often display an immature or semi-mature phenotype with characteristically low expression of costimulatory (e.g. CD80, CD86) and MHC molecules on their surface. Tolerogenic DCs also produce different cytokines as mature DCs (e.g. anti-inflammatory cytokines interleukin (IL)-10, transforming growth factor-β (TGF-β)). Moreover, tolerogenic DCs may also express various inhibitory surface molecules (e.g. programmed cell death ligand (PDL)-1, PDL-2) or can modulate metabolic parameters and change T cell response. For example, tolerogenic DCs can release or induce enzymes such as indoleamine 2,3-dioxygenase (IDO) or heme oxygenase-1 (HO-1). IDO promotes the degradation of tryptophan to N-formylkynurenin leading to reduced T cell proliferation, whereas HO- 1 catalyzes degradation of hemoglobin resulting in production of monoxide and lower DC immunogenicity. Besides that, tolerogenic DCs also may produce retinoic acid (RA), which induces Treg differentiation.

Human tolerogenic DCs may be induced by various immunosuppressive drugs or biomediators. Immunosuppressive drugs, e.g. corticosteroid dexamethasone, rapamycin, cyclosporine or acetylsalicylic acid, cause low expression of costimulatory molecules, reduced expression of MHC, higher expression of inhibitory molecules (e.g. PDL-1) or higher secretion of IL-10 or IDO. In addition, incubation with inhibitory cytokines IL-10 or TGF-β leads to generation of tolerogenic phenotype. Other mediators also affect generation of tolerogenic DC, e.g. vitamin D3, vitamin D2, hepatocyte growth factor or vasoactive intestinal peptide. The oldest and mostly used cytokine cocktail for in vitro DC generation is GM-CSF/IL-4.

Tolerogenic DCs may be a potential candidate for specific immunotherapy and are studied for using them for treatment of inflammatory, autoimmune and allergic diseases and also in transplant medicine. Important and interesting feature of tolerogenic DCs is also the migratory capacity toward secondary lymph organs, leading to T-cell mediated immunosuppression. The first trial to transfer tolerogenic DCs to humans was undertaken by Ralph Steinman's group in 2001. Relating to the DC administration, various application have been used in humans in last years. Tolerogenic DCs have been injected e.g. intraperitoneally in patients with Crohn's disease, intradermally in diabetes and rheumatoid arthritis patients, subcutaneously in rheumatoid arthritis patients and via arthroscopic injections in joints of patient with rheumatoid and inflammatory arthritis.

Therefore, it is necessary to test tolerogenic DCs for a stable phenotype to exclude a loss of the regulatory function and a switch to an immunostimulatory activity.

== Characteristic surface molecules ==
Despite tol-DCs not being lineage specific, they generally express more cell-surface immuno-suppressive molecules and factors in comparison with immunogenic co-stimulatory molecules. Higher expression of inhibitory molecules is associated with their tolerogenic abilities.

These molecules are: PD-L1, immunoglobulin like transcripts ILT (ILT3/4/5), B7-H1, SLAM, DEC-205. Tolerogenic effect has been demonstrated also by over-expression of Jagged-1 on DCs which in turn induced antigen specific T regulatory cells producing TGF-b.

== Mechanism of tolerogenicity ==
Tol-DCs promotes central and peripheral tolerance. These tolerogenic properties are executed by deletion of T cells, induction of Tregs and anergized T cells, then by expression of immunomodulatory molecules such as PD-L1 and PD-L2, heme oxygenase 1, HLA-G, CD95L, TNF-related apoptosis inducing ligands, galectin-1 and DC-SIGN and production of immunosuppressive molecules such as IL-10, TGF-b, indoleamine 2,3-dioxygenase (IDO), IL-27 and NO.

== Cytokines and molecules in differentiation of tol-DCs ==
Tol-DCs can be induced by various stimuli. It has been shown that following molecules induce/promote/favour induction of tol-DCs: IL-10, IL-27, TGF-b1, hepatocyte growth factor, vasoactive intestinal peptide, retinoid acid, vitamin D3, corticosteroids, rapamycin, cyclosporine, tacrolism, aspirin and ligands of AhR.

== Tolerance-inducing vaccination ==
Currently are characterized two subpopulations of human tolerogenic DCs: CD83^{high}CCR7^{+} and CD83^{low}CCR7^{−} IL-10DCs. CD83^{high} IL-10DCs display a stable phenotype under inflammatory conditions and show higher migratory capacity, providing migration to secondary lymphoid organs. Therefore, CD83^{high} IL-10DCs could be promising and great candidates for tolerance-inducing vaccination studies in vivo.

In 2011, Giannoukakis et al. published results of randomized, double-blind phase I study of autologous DCs vaccination in type I diabetic patients. Treatment with these cells was safe and well tolerated.

== Populations of tolerogenic dendritic cells ==
The whole pool of tolerogenic dendritic cells can be divided in two large groups - Naturally occurring tolerogenic DCs and induced tolerogenic DCs.

=== Naturally occurring tolerogenic dendritic cells. ===
Natural tol-DCs are mostly present in site of tolerogenic environment. They are maintained in their tolerogenic state by anti-inflammatory cytokines presented in those environments, but they can be easily overridden by inflammatory signals into being immunogenic. They can be found in intestinal, pulmonary, cutaneous, blood and hepatic tissues. It is yet expected they will be found even elsewhere.

=== Immature and semimature dendritic cells (iDCs) with tolerogenic properties ===
Their tolerogenic effect is mostly due to their lack of immunogenic co-stimulatory molecules despite their ability to present antigens. This phenomenon results in T cells anergy. Repetitive stimulation of T cells by iDCs can convert them into Tregs Immature and semimature dendritic cells are tolerogenic under steady-state conditions and once exposed to pro-inflammatory milieu they can also become immunogenic.

=== Induced tolerogenic dendritic cells ===
Tol-DCs can be induced by chemicals, pathological conditions or molecular modifications.

==== Pathogen-induced tolerogenic DC ====
Certain pathogens are capable of hijacking host immune tolerance and induce Tregs in their surroundings.

==== Tumour-induced tolerogenic DC ====
Tumours also developed ways of inducing tol-DCs resulting in differentiation and accumulation of Tregs in their stroma and draining lymph node.

==== Pharmacologically-induced tolerogenic DCs ====
As already mentioned above many pharmacological substances are capable of inducing tol-DCs including corticosteroids, rapamycin, cyclosporine, tacrolism, aspirin.

==== Genetically-induced tolerogenic DCs ====
Genetic manipulations can used to confer tolerogenic properties on DCs such as gene knock down, knock-out, transgenic over expression of proteins and others.
