= Thymocyte =

Premature form of T cells present in the thymus

A thymocyte is an immune cell present in the thymus, before it undergoes transformation into a T cell. Thymocytes are produced as stem cells in the bone marrow and reach the thymus via the blood.

Thymopoiesis describes the process which turns thymocytes into mature T cells according to either negative or positive selection. This selection process is vitally important in shaping the population of thymocytes into a peripheral pool of T cells that are able to respond to foreign pathogens but remain tolerant towards the body's own antigens. Positive selection selects cells which are able to bind MHC class I or II molecules with at least a weak affinity. This eliminates (by a process called "death by neglect") those T cells which would be non-functional due to an inability to bind MHC. Negative selection destroys thymocytes with a high affinity for self peptides or MHC. This eliminates cells which would direct immune responses towards self-proteins in the periphery. Negative selection is not 100% effective, and some autoreactive T cells escape and are released into the circulation. Additional mechanisms of peripheral tolerance exist to silence these cells, but if these fail, autoimmunity may arise.

== Stages of maturation ==
Thymocytes are classified into a number of distinct maturational stages based on the expression of cell surface markers. The earliest thymocyte stage is the double negative stage (negative for both CD4 and CD8), which more recently has been better described as Lineage-negative, and which can be divided into four substages. The next major stage is the double positive stage (positive for both CD4 and CD8). The final stage in maturation is the single positive stage (positive for either CD4 or CD8).

=== In mice ===
| Stage | Defining surface markers | Location | Significant events |
|---|---|---|---|
| Double negative 1 or ETP (Early T lineage Progenitor) | Lineage-CD44+CD25-CD117+ | cortex | Proliferation, Loss of B and myeloid potentials |
| Double negative 2 | Lineage-CD44+CD25+CD117+ | cortex | - |
| Double negative 3 | Lineage-CD44-CD25+ | cortex | TCR-beta rearrangement, beta selection |
| Double negative 4 | Lineage-CD44-CD25- | cortex | - |
| Double positive | CD4+CD8+ | cortex | TCR-alpha rearrangement, positive selection, negative selection |
| Single positive | CD4+CD8- or CD4-CD8+ | medulla | Negative selection |

=== In humans ===
In humans, circulating CD34+ hematopoietic stem cells reside in bone marrow. They produce precursors of T lymphocytes, which seed the thymus (thus becoming thymocytes) and differentiate under influence of the Notch protein and its ligands.

Early, double negative thymocytes express (and can be identified by) CD2, CD5 and CD7. Still during the double negative stage, CD34 expression stops and CD1 is expressed. Expression of both CD4 and CD8 makes them double positive, and matures into either CD4+ or CD8+ cells.

== Events during maturation ==
| type: | functional (beta selection) | functional (positive selection) | autoreactive (negative selection) |
| location: | cortex | cortex | cortex/medulla |
| | In order to pass the β-selection checkpoint, the β chain of the T cell receptor rearranged by the thymocyte must retain the structural properties allowing it to be presented on the surface of the thymocyte with pre-TCRα. This eliminates thymocytes with gross defects introduced into the T cell receptor by gene rearrangement. | In order to be positively-selected, thymocytes will have to interact with several cell surface molecules, MHC, to ensure reactivity and specificity. Positive selection selects cells with a T cell receptor able to bind MHC class I or II molecules with at least a weak affinity. This eliminates (by a process called "death by neglect") those T cells which would be non-functional due to an inability to bind MHC. | Negative selection is the active induction of apoptosis in thymocytes with a high affinity for self peptides or MHC. This eliminates cells which would direct immune responses towards self-proteins in the periphery. Negative selection is not 100% effective, some autoreactive T cells escape thymic censorship, and are released into the circulation. Additional mechanisms of tolerance active in the periphery exist to silence these cells such as anergy, deletion, and regulatory T cells. If these peripheral tolerance mechanisms also fail, autoimmunity may arise. |

=== Thymus settling ===
Thymocytes are ultimately derived from bone marrow hematopoietic progenitor cells [see hematopoietic stem cell, hematopoiesis] which reach the thymus through the circulation. The number of progenitors that enter the thymus each day is thought to be extremely small. Therefore, which progenitors colonize the thymus is unknown. Currently Early Lymphoid Progenitors (ELP) are proposed to settle the thymus and are likely the precursors of at least some thymocytes. ELPs are Lineage-CD44+CD25-CD117+ and thus closely resemble ETPs, the earliest progenitors in the thymus. Precursors enter the thymus at the cortico-medullary junction. Molecules known to be important for thymus entry include P-selectin (CD62P) and the chemokine receptors CCR7 and CCR9.

Following thymus entry, progenitors proliferate to generate the ETP population. This step is followed by the generation of DN2 thymocytes which migrate from the cortico-medullary junction toward the thymus capsule. DN3 thymocytes are generated at the subcapsular zone.

In addition to proliferation, differentiation and T lineage commitment occurs within the DN thymocyte population. Commitment, or loss of alternative lineage potentials (such as myeloid, B, and NK lineage potentials), is dependent on Notch signaling, and is complete by the DN3 stage. Following T lineage commitment, DN3 thymocytes undergo β-selection.

=== β-selection ===
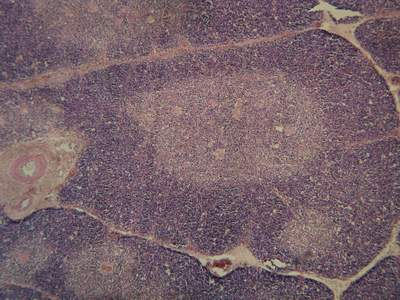
Histology of the thymus showing the cortex and medulla

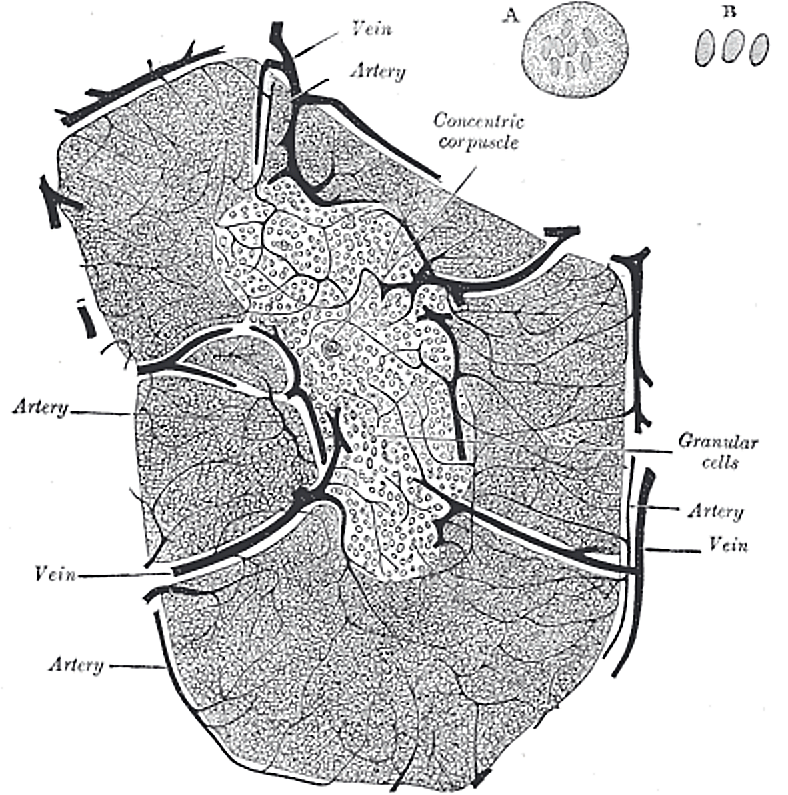
Minute structure of thymus.

The ability of T cells to recognize foreign antigens is mediated by the T cell receptor (TCR), which is a surface protein able to recognize short protein sequences (peptides) that are presented on MHC. The purpose of thymocyte development is to produce mature T cells with a diverse array of functional T cell receptors, through the process of TCR gene rearrangement.

Unlike most genes, which have a stable sequence in each cell which expresses them, the T cell receptor is made up of a series of alternative gene fragments. In order to create a functional T cell receptor, the double negative thymocytes use a series of DNA-interacting enzymes to clip the DNA and bring separate gene fragments together. The outcome of this process is that each T cell receptor has a different sequence, due to different choice of gene fragments and the errors introduced during the cutting and joining process (see section on V(D)J recombination for more information on TCR rearrangement). The evolutionary advantage in having a large number of unique T cell receptors is that each T cell is capable of recognizing a different peptide, providing a defense against rapidly evolving pathogens.

TCR rearrangement occurs in two steps. First the TCRβ chain is rearranged at the DN3 stage of T cell development. The TCRβ chain is paired with the pre-Tα to generate the pre-TCR. The cellular disadvantage in the rearrangement process is that many of the combinations of the T cell receptor gene fragments are non-functional. To eliminate thymocytes which have made a non-functional T cell receptor, only cells that have successfully rearranged the beta chain to produce a functional pre-TCR are allowed to develop beyond the DN3 stage. Cells that fail to produce a functional pre-TCR are eliminated by apoptosis. This process is referred to as the beta-selection checkpoint. Successful beta-selection requires that TCRβ is produced, TCRβ is capable of pairing with pre-Tα to generate the pre-TCR, and that the pre-TCR can interact on the cell surface with the TCR signalling proteins.

In the β-selection stage similarly to the mature TCR, pre-TCR also forms an immunological synapse. Although the pre-TCR and the peptide-bound MHC interaction is not essential for T cell development, it plays a critical role in encouraging the preferential proliferation of cells whose pre-TCR can bind self-MHC.

Following β-selection thymocytes generate CD4+CD8+ double positive cells, which then undergo TCRα rearrangement, resulting in completely assembled TCR.

=== Positive selection and lineage commitment ===
A figure depicting the process of T cell / thymocyte positive and negative selection in the thymus

Thymocytes which pass β-selection express a T cell receptor which is capable of assembling on the surface. However, many of these T cell receptors will still be non-functional, due to an inability to bind MHC. The next major stage of thymocyte development is positive selection, to keep only those thymocytes which have a T cell receptor capable of binding MHC. The T cell receptor requires CD8 as a coreceptor to bind to MHC class I, and CD4 as a coreceptor to bind MHC class II. At this stage thymocytes upregulate both CD4 and CD8, becoming double positive cells.

Double positive thymocytes that have a T cell receptor capable of binding MHC class I or class II (even with a weak affinity) receive signalling through the T cell receptor. Thymocytes that have a T cell receptor incapable of binding MHC class I or class II undergo apoptosis. Some thymocytes are able to rescue failed positive selection by receptor editing (rearrangement of the other T cell receptor allele to produce a new T cell receptor).

The double positive thymocytes undergo lineage commitment, maturing into a CD8+ T cell (recognising MHC class I) or a CD4+ T cell (recognising MHC class II). Lineage commitment occurs at the late stage of positive selection and works by downregulation of both CD4 and CD8 (reducing the signal from the T cell receptor) and then upregulation of CD4 only. Thymocytes that start receiving signal again are those that recognise MHC class II, and they become CD4+ T cells. Thymocytes that do not start receiving signal again are those that recognize MHC class I, and they downregulate CD4 and upregulate CD8, to become CD8+ T cells. Both of these thymocytes types are known as single positive thymocytes.

=== Negative selection ===
Success in positive selection allows the thymocyte to undergo a number of maturational changes during the transition to a single positive T cell. The single positive T cells upregulate the chemokine receptor CCR7, causing migration from the cortex to the medulla. At this stage the key maturation process involves negative selection, the elimination of autoreactive thymocytes.

The key disadvantage in a gene rearrangement process for T cell receptors is that by random chance, some arrangements of gene fragments will create a T cell receptor capable of binding self-peptides presented on MHC class I or MHC class II. If T cells bearing these T cell receptors were to enter the periphery, they would be capable of activating an immune response against self, resulting in autoimmunity. Negative selection is the process evolved to reduce this risk. During negative selection, all thymocytes with a high affinity for binding self peptides presented on MHC class I or class II are induced to upregulate BCL2L11, a protein which drives apoptosis. Cells which do not have a high affinity for self-antigens survive negative selection. At this stage, some cells are also selected to become regulatory T cells, usually cells which have an intermediate affinity for self-peptide.

Negative selection can occur at the double positive stage in the cortex. However, the repertoire of peptides in the cortex is limited to those expressed by epithelial cells, and double positive cells are poor at undergoing negative selection. Therefore, the most important site for negative selection is the medulla, once cells are at the single positive stage. In order to remove thymocytes reactive to peripheral organs, the transcription factors Aire and Fezf2 drive the expression of multiple peripheral antigens, such as insulin, resulting in deletion of cells specific for those antigens. This allows single positive thymocytes to be exposed to a more complex set of self-antigens than is present in the cortex, and therefore more efficiently deletes those T cells which are autoreactive.

Single positive thymocytes remain in the medulla for 1–2 weeks, surveying self-antigens to test for autoreactivity. During this time they undergo final maturational changes, and then exit the thymus using S1P and CCR7. Upon entry to the peripheral bloodstream, the cells are considered mature T cells, and not thymocytes.

Negative selection is not 100% effective. Some autoreactive T cells escape thymic censorship and are released into the circulation. Additional mechanisms of peripheral tolerance active in the periphery exist to silence these cells such as anergy, deletion, and regulatory T cells. If these peripheral tolerance mechanisms also fail, autoimmunity may arise.

Thymus transplantation results in that T cells are taught to avoid reacting with donor antigens instead, and may still react with many self-antigens in the body. Autoimmune disease is a frequent complication after thymus transplantation, found in 42% of subjects over 1 year post-transplantation. However, this is partially explained by that the indication itself, that is, complete DiGeorge syndrome (absence of thymus), increases the risk of autoimmune disease.

== Cancer ==
Thymocytes that gain oncogenic mutations allowing uncontrolled proliferation can become thymic lymphomas.

== Alternative lineages ==
As well as classical αβ T cells (their development of which is outlined above), a number of other T lineages develop in the thymus, including γδ T cells and Natural Killer T (NKT)cells. Additionally, other non-T hematopoietic lineages can develop in the thymus, including B lymphocytes (B cells), Natural Killer lymphocytes (NK cells).), myeloid cells, and dendritic cells. However, the thymus is not a source of B, NKC, or myeloid development (this statement is not true for all B-cells or NKC). The development of these cells in the thymus reflects the multi-potent nature of hematopoietic progenitors that seed the thymus. Mature B-cells and other APCs can also be found in the medulla which contribute to negative selection processes.
