= Molecular mimicry =

Proposed cause of autoimmunity

Molecular mimicry is the theoretical possibility that sequence similarities between foreign and self-peptides are enough to result in the cross-activation of autoreactive T or B cells by pathogen-derived peptides. Despite the prevalence of several peptide sequences which can be both foreign and self in nature, just a few crucial residues can activate a single antibody or TCR (T cell receptor). This highlights the importance of structural homology in the theory of molecular mimicry. Upon activation, these "peptide mimic" specific T or B cells can cross-react with self-epitopes, thus leading to tissue pathology (autoimmunity). Molecular mimicry is one of several ways in which autoimmunity can be evoked. A molecular mimicking event is more than an epiphenomenon despite its low probability, and these events have serious implications in the onset of many human autoimmune disorders.

One possible cause of autoimmunity, the failure to recognize self antigens as "self", is a loss of immunological tolerance, the ability for the immune system to discriminate between self and non-self. Other possible causes include mutations governing programmed cell death or environmental products that injure target tissues, thus causing a release of immunostimulatory alarm signals. Growth in the field of autoimmunity has resulted in more frequent diagnosis of autoimmune diseases. The resulting data show that autoimmune diseases affect approximately 1 in 31 people within the general population. Growth has also led to a greater characterization of what autoimmunity is and how it can be studied and treated. With more research comes growth in the study of the several different ways in which autoimmunity can occur, one of which is molecular mimicry. The mechanism by which pathogens have similar amino acid sequences or the homologous three-dimensional crystal structure of immunodominant epitopes remains a mystery.

== Immunological tolerance ==
Tolerance is a fundamental property of the immune system. Tolerance involves non-self discrimination which is the ability of the normal immune system to recognize and respond to foreign antigens, but not self antigens. Autoimmunity is evoked when this tolerance to self antigen is broken. Tolerance within an individual is normally evoked as a fetus. This is known as maternal-fetal tolerance where B cells expressing receptors specific for a particular antigen enter the circulation of the developing fetus via the placenta.

After pre-B cells leave the bone marrow where they are synthesized, they are moved to the bone marrow where the maturation of B cells occurs. It is here where the first wave of B cell tolerance arises. Within the bone marrow, pre-B cells will encounter various self and foreign antigens present in the thymus that enter the thymus from peripheral sites via the circulatory system. Within the thymus, pre-T cells undergo a selection process where they must be positively selected and should avoid negative selection. B cells that bind with low avidity to self-MHC receptors are positively selected for maturation, those that do not die by apoptosis. Cells that survive positive selection, but bind strongly to self-antigens are negatively selected also by active induction of apoptosis. This negative selection is known as clonal deletion, one of the mechanisms for B cell tolerance. Approximately 99 percent of pre-B cells within the thymus are negatively selected. Only approximately 1 percent are positively selected for maturity.

However, there is only a limited repertoire of antigen that T cells can encounter within the thymus. T cell tolerance then must occur within the periphery after the induction of T cell tolerance within the thymus as a more diverse group of antigens can be encountered in peripheral tissues. This same positive and negative selection mechanism, but in peripheral tissues, is known as clonal anergy. The mechanism of clonal anergy is important to maintain tolerance to many autologous antigens. Active suppression is the other known mechanism of T cell tolerance. Active suppression involves the injection of large amounts of foreign antigen in the absence of an adjuvant which leads to a state of unresponsiveness. This unresponsive state is then transferred to a naïve recipient from the injected donor to induce a state of tolerance within the recipient.

Tolerance is also produced in B cells. There are also various processes which lead to B cell tolerance. Just as in T cells, clonal deletion and clonal anergy can physically eliminate autoreactive B cell clones. Receptor editing is another mechanism for B cell tolerance. This involves the reactivation or maintenance of V(D)J recombination in the cell which leads to the expression of novel receptor specificity through V region gene rearrangements which will create variation in the heavy and light immunoglobulin (Ig) chains.

== Autoimmunity ==
Autoimmunity can thus be defined simply as exceptions to the tolerance "rules." By doing this, an immune response is generated against self-tissue and cells. These mechanisms are known by many to be intrinsic. However, there are pathogenic mechanisms for the generation of autoimmune disease. Pathogens can induce autoimmunity by polyclonal activation of B or T cells, or increased expression of major histocompatibility complex (MHC) class I or II molecules. There are several ways in which a pathogen can cause an autoimmune response. A pathogen may contain a protein that acts as a mitogen to encourage cell division, thus causing more B or T cell clones to be produced. Similarly, a pathogenic protein may act as a superantigen which causes rapid polyclonal activation of B or T cells. Pathogens can also cause the release of cytokines resulting in the activation of B or T cells, or they can alter macrophage function. Finally, pathogens may also expose B or T cells to cryptic determinants, which are self antigen determinants that have not been processed and presented sufficiently to tolerize the developing T cells in the thymus and are presented at the periphery where the infection occurs.

Molecular mimicry has been characterized as recently as the 1970s as another mechanism by which a pathogen can generate autoimmunity. Molecular mimicry is defined as similar structures shared by molecules from dissimilar genes or by their protein products. Either the linear amino acid sequence or the conformational fit of the immunodominant epitope may be shared between the pathogen and host. This is also known as "cross-reactivity" between self antigen of the host and immunodominant epitopes of the pathogen. An autoimmune response is then generated against the epitope. Due to similar sequence homology in the epitope between the pathogen and the host, cells and tissues of the host associated with the protein are destroyed as a result of the autoimmune response.

== Probability of mimicry events ==
The prerequisite for molecular mimicry to occur is thus the sharing of the immunodominant epitope between the pathogen and the immunodominant self sequence that is generated by a cell or tissue. However, due to the amino acid variation between different proteins, molecular mimicry should not happen from a probability standpoint. Assuming five to six amino acid residues are used to induce a monoclonal antibody response, the probability of 20 amino acids being identical in six consecutive residues between two proteins is 1 in 20^{6} or 1 in 64,000,000. However, there has been evidence shown and documented of many molecular mimicry events. This is because the similarity is also looked at between human and pathogen proteomes, rather than the selected human and pathogen proteins.

To determine which epitopes are shared between pathogen and human, large protein databases are used. The largest protein database in the world, known as the UniProt database (formerly SwissProt), has shown reports of molecular mimicry becoming more common with expansion of the database. The database contains 86.6 × 10^{9} residues as of 2023. Assuming 20 different amino acids are randomly present at every position, the probability of finding a perfect match with a five-amino-acid-long motif is 1 in 3.2 × 10^{6}. In other words, we can expect to observe each different motif of five amino acids in length for one time on average, within two different proteomes containing total 3.2 × 10^{6} amino acids through its proteins that consist of a random sequence of 20 different amino acids. However, the distribution of five-amino-acids-long motif matches is expected to generate a bell curve with a peak at single-match position for each motif. That is, while we are likely to see each different motif once in the two proteomes in this example, there will be motifs that are not shared. There will also be motifs shared more than once between the two proteomes, which is observed for fewer motifs as the number of shares increases. Assuming that the SwissProt database has the same structure as in the example, an average of 86.6 × 10^{9} ÷ (3.2 × 10^{6}) ≈ 27 × 10^{3} matches. This number of matches is huge and will increase as the database expands. This expectation was only five when the database contained 1.5 × 10^{7} residues. As a result, there are overrepresented sequence motifs in the database. For example, the QKRAA sequence is an amino acid motif in the third hypervariable region of HLA-DRB1*04:01. This motif is also expressed on numerous proteins of other organisms, such as on gp110 of the Epstein-Barr virus and in E. coli. This motif occurs 37 times in the database. This would suggest that the linear amino acid sequence may not be the single underlying cause of molecular mimicry since it can be found numerous times within the database. The possibility exists, then, for similarity in three-dimensional structure between two peptides to be recognized by T cell clones when there is variability within the amino acid sequence. This, therefore, uncovers a flaw of such large databases. They may be able to give a hint to relationships between epitopes, but the important three-dimensional structure cannot yet be searched for in such a database.

== Structural mimicry ==
Despite no obvious amino acid sequence similarity from pathogen to host factors, structural studies have revealed that mimicry can still occur at the host level. In some cases, pathogenic mimics can possess a structural architecture that differs markedly from that of the functional homologues. Therefore, proteins of dissimilar sequence may have a common structure which elicits an autoimmune response. It has been hypothesized that these virulent proteins display their mimicry through molecular surfaces that mimic host protein surfaces (protein fold or three-dimensional conformation), which have been obtained by convergent evolution. It has also been theorized that these similar protein folds have been obtained by horizontal gene transfer, most likely from a eukaryotic host. This further supports the theory that microbial organisms have evolved a mechanism of concealment similar to that of higher organisms such as the African praying mantis or chameleon who camouflage themselves so that they can mimic their background as not to be recognized by others.

Despite dissimilar sequence homology between self and foreign peptide, weak electrostatic interactions between foreign peptide and the MHC can also mimic self peptide to elicit an autoimmune response within the host. For example, charged residues can explain the enhanced on-rate and reduced off-rate of a particular antigen or can contribute to a higher affinity and activity for a particular antigen that can perhaps mimic that of the host. Similarly, prominent ridges on the floor of peptide-binding grooves can do such things as create C-terminal bulges in particular peptides that can greatly increase the interaction between foreign and self peptide on the MHC. Similarly, there has been evidence that even gross features such as acidic/basic and hydrophobic/hydrophilic interactions have allowed foreign peptides to interact with an antibody or MHC and TCR. It is now apparent that sequence similarity considerations may not be sufficient when evaluating potential mimic epitopes and the underlying mechanisms of molecular mimicry. Molecular mimicry, from these examples, has therefore been shown to occur also in the absence of any true sequence homology.

There has been increasing evidence for mimicking events caused not only by amino acid similarities but also in similarities in binding motifs to the MHC. Molecular mimicry is thus occurring between two recognized peptides that have similar antigenic surfaces in the absence of primary sequence homology. For example, specific single amino acid residues such as cysteine (creates di-sulfide bonds), arginine or lysine (form multiple hydrogen bonds), could be essential for T cell cross-reactivity. These single residues may be the only residues conserved between self and foreign antigen that allow the structurally similar but sequence non-specific peptides to bind to the MHC.

== Epitope spreading ==
Epitope spreading, also known as determinant spreading, is another common way in which autoimmunity can occur which uses the molecular mimicry mechanism. Autoreactive T cells are activated de novo by self epitopes released secondary to pathogen-specific T cell-mediated bystander damage. T cell responses to progressively less dominant epitopes are activated as a consequence of the release of other antigens secondary to the destruction of the pathogen with a homologous immunodominant sequence. Thus, inflammatory responses induced by specific pathogens that trigger pro-inflammatory T_{h}1 responses have the ability to persist in genetically susceptible hosts. This may lead to organ-specific autoimmune disease. Conversely, epitope spreading could be due to target antigens being physically linked intracellularly as members of a complex to self antigen. The result of this is an autoimmune response that is triggered by exogenous antigen that progresses to a truly autoimmune response against mimicked self antigen and other antigens. From these examples, it is clear that the search for candidate mimic epitopes must extend beyond the immunodominant epitopes of a given autoimmune response.

== Implications in human disease ==
=== Diseases of the central nervous system ===
The HIV-1 virus has been shown to cause diseases of the central nervous system (CNS) in humans through a molecular mimicry apparatus. HIV-1 gp41 is used to bind chemokines on the cell surface of the host so that the virion may gain entrance into the host. Astrocytes are cells of the CNS which are used to regulate the concentrations of K^{+} and neurotransmitter which enter the cerebrospinal fluid (CSF) to contribute to the blood brain barrier. A twelve amino acid sequence (Leu-Gly-Ile-Trp-Gly-Cys-Ser-Gly-Lys-Leu-Ile-Cys) on gp41 of the HIV-1 virus (immunodominant region) shows sequence homology with a twelve amino acid protein on the surface of human astrocytes. Antibodies are produced for the HIV-1 gp41 protein. These antibodies can cross-react with astrocytes within human CNS tissue and act as autoantibodies. This contributes to many CNS complications found in AIDS patients.

Theiler's murine encephalomyelitis virus (TMEV) leads to the development in mice of a progressive CD4^{+} T cell-mediated response after these cells have infiltrated the CNS. This virus has been shown to cause CNS disease in mice that resembles multiple sclerosis, an autoimmune disease in humans that results in the gradual destruction of the myelin sheath coating axons of the CNS. The TMEV mouse virus shares a thirteen amino acid sequence (His-Cys-Leu-Gly-Lys-Trp-Leu-Gly-His-Pro-Asp-Lys-Phe) (PLP (proteolipid protein) 139-151 epitope) with that of a human myelin-specific epitope. Bystander myelin damage is caused by virus specific T_{h}1 cells that cross react with this self epitope. To test the efficacy in which TMEV uses molecular mimicry to its advantage, a sequence of the human myelin-specific epitope was inserted into a non-pathogenic TMEV variant. As a result, there was a CD4^{+} T cell response and autoimmune demyelination was initiated by infection with a TMEV peptide ligand. In humans, it has recently been shown that there are other possible targets for molecular mimicry in patients with multiple sclerosis. These involve the hepatitis B virus mimicking the human proteolipid protein (myelin protein) and the Epstein-Barr virus mimicking anti-myelin oligodendrocyte glycoprotein (contributes to a ring of myelin around blood vessels) or the glial cell adhesion protein (GlialCAM) found in the CNS.

=== Muscle disorders ===
Myasthenia gravis is another common autoimmune disease. This disease causes fluctuating muscle weakness and fatigue. The disease occurs due to detectable antibodies produced against the human acetylcholine receptor. The receptor contains a seven amino acid sequence (Trp-Thr-Tyr-Asp-Gly-Thr-Lys) in the α-subunit that demonstrates immunological cross-reactivity with a shared immunodominant domain of gpD of the herpes simplex virus (HSV). Similar to HIV-1, gpD also aids in binding to chemokines on the cell surface of the host to gain entry into the host. Cross-reactivity of the self epitope (α-subunit of the receptor) with antibodies produced against HSV suggests that the virus is associated with the initiation of myasthenia gravis. Not only does HSV cause immunologic cross-reactivity, but the gpD peptide also competitively inhibits the binding of antibody made against the α-subunit to its corresponding peptide on the α-subunit. Despite this, an autoimmune response still occurs. This further shows an immunologically significant sequence homology to the biologically active site of the human acetylcholine receptor.

== Control ==
There are ways in which autoimmunity caused by molecular mimicry can be avoided. Control of the initiating factor (pathogen) via vaccination seems to be the most common method to avoid autoimmunity. Inducing tolerance to the host autoantigen in this way may also be the most stable factor. The development of a downregulating immune response to the shared epitope between pathogen and host may be the best way of treating an autoimmune disease caused by molecular mimicry. Alternatively, treatment with immunosuppressive drugs such as ciclosporin and azathioprine has also been used as a possible solution. However, in many cases this has been shown to be ineffective because cells and tissues have already been destroyed at the onset of the infection.

== Conclusion ==
The concept of molecular mimicry is a useful tool in understanding the etiology, pathogenesis, treatment, and prevention of autoimmune disorders. Molecular mimicry is, however, only one mechanism by which an autoimmune disease can occur in association with a pathogen. Understanding the mechanisms of molecular mimicry may allow future research to be directed toward uncovering the initiating infectious agent as well as recognizing the self determinant. This way, future research may be able to design strategies for treatment and prevention of autoimmune disorders. The use of transgenic models such as those used for discovery of the mimicry events leading to diseases of the CNS and muscle disorders has helped evaluate the sequence of events leading to molecular mimicry.

== Related terms ==
- Viral apoptotic mimicry, defined by the exposure of phosphatidylserine (a marker for apoptosis) on the pathogen surface – in the case of apoptosis, the dead cell surface that is used to gain viral access to the interior of immune cells.
