= Infectious tolerance =

Infectious tolerance is a term referring to a phenomenon where a tolerance-inducing state is transferred from one cell population to another. It can be induced in many ways; although it is often artificially induced, it is a natural in vivo process. A number of research deal with the development of a strategy utilizing this phenomenon in transplantation immunology. The goal is to achieve long-term tolerance of the transplant through short-term therapy.

== History ==
The term "infectious tolerance" was originally used by Gershon and Kondo in 1970 for suppression of naive lymphocyte populations by cells with regulatory function and for the ability to transfer a state of unresponsiveness from one animal to another. Gershon and Kondo discovered that T cells can not only amplify but also diminish immune responses. The T cell population causing this down-regulation was called suppressor T cells and was intensively studied for the following years (nowadays they are called regulatory T cells and are again a very attractive for research). These and other research in the 1970s showed greater complexity of immune regulation, unfortunately these experiments were largely disregarded, as methodological difficulties prevented clear evidence. Later developed new tolerogenic strategies have provided strong evidence to re-evaluate the phenomenon of T cell mediated suppression, in particular the use of non-depleting anti-CD4 monoclonal antibodies, demonstrating that neither thymus nor clonal deletion is necessary to induce tolerance. In 1989 was successfully induced classical transplantation tolerance to skin grafts in adult mice using antibodies blocking T cell coreceptors in CD4+ populations. Later was shown that the effect of monoclonal antibodies is formation of regulatory T lymphocytes. It has been shown that transfer of tolerance to other recipients can be made without further manipulation and that this tolerance transfer depends only on CD4+ T-lymphocytes. Because second-generation tolerance arises in the absence of any monoclonal antibodies to CD4 or CD8, it probably represents a natural response of the immune system, which, once initiated, becomes self-sustaining. This ensures the long duration of once induced tolerance, for as long as the donor antigens are present.

== Mechanisms ==
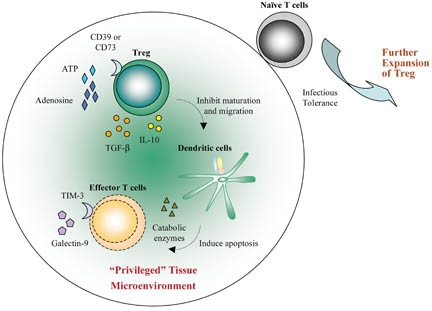
Treg migrate to the grafted tissue. Activated Treg convert ATP released by inflamed tissues to adenosine via the ectoenzymes CD39 and CD73. Local adenosine could contribute to the initial "privileged" microenvironment. Treg also secrete TGF-β and IL-10 which inhibit the maturation and migration of dendritic cells (DC). These "decommissioned" DC can secrete catabolic enzymes for depletion of essential amino acids (EAA) and, therefore, induce apoptosis of effector T cells. Moreover, the "privileged" tissues could release pro-apoptotic galectin-9 which binds to TIM-3 expressed by effector T cells such as Th1 and Th17. This further amplifies the immunosuppressive microenvironment. Each of these components within the graft can further reinforce the local anti-inflammatory state such that any naive T cell, migrating into this area, will be converted to induced Treg (iTreg) through infectious tolerance. The iTreg then expand and further suppress immunity in the "privileged" microenvironment.

During a tolerant state potential effector cells remain but are tightly regulated by induced antigen-specific CD4+ regulatory T cells (iTregs). Many subsets of iTregs play a part in this process, but CD4^{+}CD25^{+}FoxP3^{+} Tregs play a key role, because they have the ability to convert conventional T cells into iTregs directly by secretion of the suppressive cytokines TGF-β, IL-10 or IL-35, or indirectly via dendritic cells (DCs). Production of IL-10 induces the formation of another population of regulatory T cells called Tr1. Tr1 cells are dependent on IL-10 and TGF-β as well as Tregs, but differ from them by lacking expression of Foxp3. High IL-10 production is characteristic for Tr1 cells themselves and they also produce TGF-β. In the presence of IL-10 can be also induced tolerogenic DCs from monocytes, whose production of IL-10 is also important for Tr1 formation. These interactions lead to the production of enzymes such as IDO (indolamine 2,3-dioxygenase) that catabolize essential amino acids. This microenvironment with a lack of essential amino acids together with other signals results in mTOR (mammalian target of rapamycin) inhibition which, particularly in synergy with TGF-β, direct the induction of new FoxP3 (forkhead box protein 3) expressing Tregs.

== See also ==
- Immune tolerance
- Central tolerance
- Peripheral tolerance
- regulatory T cells
- Immune response
- Immune tolerance in pregnancy
