= Th 9 cell =

Sub-population of CD4+T cells

In cell biology, T_{H}9 cells (T helper type 9 cells, CD4+IL-9+IL-13−IFNγ − ) are a sub-population of CD4+T cells that produce interleukin-9 (IL-9). They play a role in defense against helminth infections, in allergic responses, in autoimmunity, and tumor suppression.

== Characterization ==
T_{H}9 cells are characterized by their cell surface expression of CD4 and CCR6 and the lack of CCR4. Additionally, they are defined by their high secretion of interleukin‑9. Besides IL-9, T_{H}9 cells also produce IL-10 and IL-21. However, their functions in T_{H}9 cells are still unclear.

== Differentation ==
Th9 cells can differentiate either from naive T lymphocytes or by a shift from T_{H}2 cells. There are numbers of cytokines, transcription factors and other molecules, that have a role in T_{H}9 differentiation.

=== Cytokines in differentiation ===
Cytokines play a major role in development of T_{H}9 cells. There are many cytokines impacting differentiation of T_{H}9 cells and their production of IL-9 but IL-4 and TGF-β are indispensable for their development and polarization.

IL-4 and TGF-β are necessary for naive T lymphocytes to differentiate into T_{H}9 cells. while TGF-β alone can switch T_{H}2 cells into T_{H}9 cells.

IL-2 is critical for interleukin-9 production by T_{H}9 cells.

IL-1 may induce IL-9 in some cases, and IL-33 is able to induce IL-9 in T cells generally. Generally IL-1 family members enhance expression of Il9 gene.

IL-25 also induces IL-9 production in vivo.

Development of T_{H}9 cells requires a balanced cytokines signaling for its establishment. All mentioned cytokines then signal through specific transcription factors, which are later on required for a T_{H}9 polarization.

=== Transcription factors in differentiation ===
STAT6, IRF4, GATA3 are absolutely required for T_{H}9 cell development and other such as PU.1, BATF, NF-κB, NFAT1, STAT5, AP-1 contribute to T_{H}9 sub-population commitment and to IL-9 production.

STAT6 is activated by signaling through IL-4 receptor. Once activated, phosphorylated STAT6 mediate the transcription of Gata3 and Irf4, which are both necessary for polarization of T_{H}9 cells. STAT6 repress the expression of transcription factors T-bet and Foxp3 in T_{H}9 cells, that normally block IL-9 production.

GATA-3 in T_{H}9 cells development represses transcriptional factor FOXP3, which would other wise let to other T helper cell subpopulation.

IRF4 binds to the promoter of Il-9 gene in T_{H}9 cells and it is dependent on STAT6.

BATF has been also shown to bind to the Il-9 gene promoter and to activate Il-9gene transcription.

PU.1 works by directly binding to the promoter of Il-9 gene and attract chromatin-modifying enzymes which reinforce Il9-gene transcription.

NF-κB and NFAT1, are needed for a TCR-induced interleukin-9 production by T_{H}9 cells.

STAT5, downstream factor of IL-2, induce T_{H}9 cells IL-9. STAT5 directly bind to Il-9 gene promoter, although it has not yet been determined how important this pathway is for T_{H}9 development in vitro and in vivo.

=== Molecules with regulatory effects ===
Numbers of molecules enhance or dampen IL-9 production and contribute to T_{H}9 development such as:

Activin A that can fully substitute the role of TGF-β in T_{H}9 cells, then Jagged2, programmed cell death ligand (PD-L2), cyclooxy- genase (COX)-2, 1,25-dihydroxyvitamin D3, calcitonin gene-related peptide (CGRP), tumor necrosis factor receptor superfamily member 4 (TNFRSF4 or OX40), and thymic stromal lymphopoietin (TSLP).

== Physiological functions ==
The main physiological role of T_{H}9 cells, while poorly defined, is defense against helminthic infections. This is likely mediated by local and/or systemic production of Interleukin-9, as well as promoted survival of other anti-parasitic leukocytes, including mast cells, eosinophils and basophils.

Th9 cells have also shown both pro- and anti-tumorigenic activity, depending on the type of cancer. They have been shown to inhibit melanoma cell growth, increase anti-tumor lymphocytes, and drastically lower tumor mass and disease severity. On the other hand patients suffering hepatocellular carcinoma with high T_{H}9 infiltration had shorter disease-free survival period after surgical resection.

== Pathophysiological functions ==
T_{H}9 cells appear to be linked to many pathophysiological processes. Their exact role is poorly understood, as they appear to have a pleiotropic effect and seem to be heavily dependent on the local, as well as systemic, cytokine environment.

=== Allergies ===
T_{H}9 cells are present in the peripheral blood of allergic patients while such a population is rare in non-allergic persons. Few studies have reported distinct correlations of in vivo IL-9 with serum IgE concentration. The percentages of IL-9-secreting T cells of atopic patients also correlated with serum IgE in adults with asthma.

Two studies showed that transferred T_{H}9 cells result in allergic inflammation in the lung. It was also observed that T_{H}9 cells can promote intestinal and central nervous system inflammation.

=== Asthma ===
T_{H}9 cells are strongly linked to asthma given their presence in draining lymph nodes and airways. T_{H}9-Derived IL-9 has been shown to exacerbate the allergic immune response by enhancing antibody production and increasing cell infiltration inside of the respiratory tract.

=== Autoimmune inflammation ===
T_{H}9 cells contribute to ulcerative colitis, due to the cell's ability to impair cellular repair, as well as due to the ability of secreted IL-9 to promote a T_{H}2-like immune response. This may also play a role in T_{H}9 tumor suppression (see "Physiological functions" above). T_{H}9 have been shown to play a role in both early and progressive phase of multiple sclerosis by decreasing the effects of pro-inflammatory T_{H}17. Increased levels of IL-9, mainly produced by T_{H}9 have been detected in patients in remission phase of the disease. However, in vitro differentiated Th9 have been shown to induce EAE and cause peripheral neuropathies in mice, emphasizing the importance of context in which the cells develops and functions.

=== Chronic infections ===
A higher percentage of T_{H}9 cells in patients with chronic HCV was linked to higher levels of liver enzymes, more severe disease progression and faster development of HCC. Also remission and faster HCV clearance was associated with lower T_{H}9 cytokines' levels. This might be caused by T_{H}9 mediated promotion of T_{H}17 phenotype and hindering of T_{H}1 phenotype which leads to persisting viral infection. There were several publications trying to elucidate role of T_{H}9 cells in chronic HBV infection with inconsistent results.
