= T helper 3 cell =

T helper 3 cells (T_{h}3) are a subset of T lymphocytes with immunoregulary and immunosuppressive functions, that can be induced by administration of foreign oral antigen. T_{h}3 cells act mainly through the secretion of anti-inflammatory cytokine transforming growth factor beta (TGF-β) and interleukin-10 (IL-10). T_{h}3 have been described both in mice and human as CD4^{+}FOXP3^{−} regulatory T cells. T_{h}3 cells were first described in research focusing on oral tolerance in the experimental autoimmune encephalitis (EAE) mouse model and later described as CD4^{+}CD25^{−}FOXP3^{−}LAP^{+} cells, that can be induced in the gut by oral antigen through T cell receptor (TCR) signalling.

The function of T helper cells generally is to mediate the immune response by secreting cytokines and interacting with B-cells to enhance or inhibit their activity. This is of particular importance in the gut as this is where the highest load of foreign material, food, is present. T_{h}3 cells are involved in mucosal immunity and protecting mucosal surfaces in the gut from non-pathogenic non-self antigens. They mediate this non-inflammatory environment by secreting TGF-β and IL-10. TGF-beta promotes the class switch to low concentrations of IgA which is noninflammatory. IgA does not usually activate the complement system and is not involved with phagocytosis. T_{h}3 inhibits T_{h}1 and T_{h}2 cells.

T_{h}3 cells have different cytokine requirements for their growth from CD25^{+}CD4^{+} T_{reg} cells. The survival of CD25^{+}CD4^{+} T_{reg} cells is dependent upon interleukin 2 (IL-2), while in vitro differentiation of T_{h}3 cells is enhanced by TGF-β, IL-4, and IL-10.

Findings suggest that T_{h}3 cells are a different lineage from naturally arising CD25^{+}CD4^{+} T_{reg} cells, but it is still unclear whether T_{h}3 cells are the same as induced T_{reg} cells because of the lack of a specific marker for T_{h}3 cells. It was previously shown that TGF-β was produced by intestinal dendritic cells, which has been considered to be the source of cytokines for the induction of T_{h}3 cells in the intestine. Additionally, since TGF-β production was induced by cytotoxic T-lymphocyte antigen 4 (CTLA-4), which is constitutively expressed on naturally arising T_{reg} cells, it is possible that TGF-β production from T_{reg} cells through CTLA-4^{−} mediated signaling may stimulate the differentiation of both induced T_{reg} cells and T_{h}3 cells.

== T_{h}3 phenotype and secreted molecules ==
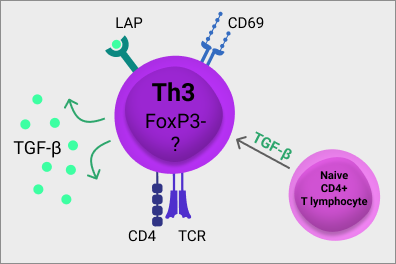
T helper 3 cell (T_{h}3 ) phenotype.

T_{h}3 cells are characterised as CD4^{+}CD25^{−}CD69^{+}FOXP3-LAP^{+} cells. Unlike the well characterised T regulatory (T_{reg} ) cells, T_{h}3 cells do not express transcription factor FOXP3. There is a lack of specific transcription factor for full and reliable recognition of the T_{h}3 cell population.

Type II-lectin receptor CD69 is presented on cell surface shortly after activation. The presence of CD69 is not specific for T_{h}3 cells, since it is expressed on other lymphocytes, mainly subsets that are tissue resident. The latency-associated peptide (LAP) noncovalently bounds TGF-β and can be expressed by many cells of the immune system.

In tumors T_{h}3 cells can express lymphocyte activation gene-3 (LAG3). T_{h}3 cells produce vast amounts of TGF-β and to a lesser degree also the anti-inflammatory cytokine interleukin 10 (IL-10). In colorectal cancer T_{h}3 cells were described as 50 times more potent immune suppressors than the classical regulatory FOXP3^{+} T lymphocytes and their functions was mainly mediated by secretion of suppressive cytokines.

LAG3 acts as a negative regulator of T cell activation and function and can also be expressed on NK cells and other T cells, than T_{h}3. Because of its structural similarity to CD4, LAG3 can bind MHC class II molecules.

== Activation and effector functions ==
T_{h}3 cells can be activated by TCR stimulation after the recognition of an antigen or induced from CD4+ T lymphocytes by TGF-β in the presence of IL-10 and IL-4 cytokines.

T_{h}3 participate in the regulation of the immune response via mechanisms independent on cell-to-cell contact. Secretion of anti-inflammatory cytokine TGF-β by T_{h}3 cells helps to maintain homeostasis in the gut and suppress exaggerated inflammatory and autoimmune responses in the body. TGF-β is a crucial cytokine for maintaining the naturally occurring T_{reg} cells, that suppress T_{h}1 and T_{h}2 immune functions. T_{h}3 cells can also directly suppress T_{h}1 and T_{h}2 cells by secretion of TGF-β and provide help to B cells towards IgA secretion.
