= Immune tolerance =

State of unresponsiveness of the immune system

Immune tolerance, also known as immunological tolerance or immunotolerance, is the immune system's state of unresponsiveness to substances or tissues that would otherwise trigger an immune response. It arises from prior exposure to a specific antigen and contrasts the immune system's conventional role in eliminating foreign antigens. Depending on the site of induction, tolerance is categorized as either central tolerance, occurring in the thymus and bone marrow, or peripheral tolerance, taking place in other tissues and lymph nodes. Although the mechanisms establishing central and peripheral tolerance differ, their outcomes are analogous, ensuring immune system modulation.

Immune tolerance is important for normal physiology and homeostasis. Central tolerance is crucial for enabling the immune system to differentiate between self and non-self antigens, thereby preventing autoimmunity. Peripheral tolerance plays a significant role in preventing excessive immune reactions to environmental agents, including allergens and gut microbiota. Deficiencies in either central or peripheral tolerance mechanisms can lead to autoimmune diseases, with conditions such as systemic lupus erythematosus, rheumatoid arthritis, type 1 diabetes, autoimmune polyendocrine syndrome type 1 (APS-1), and immunodysregulation polyendocrinopathy enteropathy X-linked syndrome (IPEX) as examples. Furthermore, disruptions in immune tolerance are implicated in the development of asthma, atopy, and inflammatory bowel disease.

In the context of pregnancy, immune tolerance is vital for the gestation of genetically distinct offspring, as it moderates the alloimmune response sufficiently to prevent miscarriage.

However, immune tolerance is not without its drawbacks. It can permit the successful infection of a host by pathogenic microbes that manage to evade immune elimination. Additionally, the induction of peripheral tolerance within the local microenvironment is a strategy employed by many cancers to avoid detection and destruction by the host's immune system.

== Historical background ==
The phenomenon of immune tolerance was first described by Ray D. Owen in 1945, who noted that dizygotic twin cattle sharing a common placenta also shared a stable mixture of each other's red blood cells (though not necessarily 50/50), and retained that mixture throughout life. Although Owen did not use the term immune tolerance, his study showed the body could be tolerant of these foreign tissues. This observation was experimentally validated by Leslie Brent, Rupert E. Billingham and Peter Medawar in 1953, who showed by injecting foreign cells into fetal or neonatal mice, they could become accepting of future grafts from the same foreign donor. However, they were not thinking of the immunological consequences of their work at the time: as Medawar explains:

We did not set out with the idea in mind of studying the immunological consequences of the phenomenon described by Owen; on the contrary, we had been goaded by Dr. H.P. Donald into trying to devise a foolproof method of distinguishing monozygotic from dizygotic twins....

However, these discoveries, and the host of allograft experiments and observations of twin chimerism they inspired, were seminal for the theories of immune tolerance formulated by Sir Frank McFarlane Burnet and Frank Fenner, who were the first to propose the deletion of self-reactive lymphocytes to establish tolerance, now termed clonal deletion. Burnet and Medawar were ultimately credited for "the discovery of acquired immune tolerance" and shared the Nobel Prize in Physiology or Medicine in 1960.

== Definitions and usage ==
In their Nobel Lecture, Medawar and Burnet define immune tolerance as "a state of indifference or non-reactivity towards a substance that would normally be expected to excite an immunological response." Other more recent definitions have remained more or less the same. The 8th edition of Janeway's Immunobiology defines tolerance as "immunologically unresponsive...to another's tissues."

Immune tolerance encompasses the range of physiological mechanisms by which the body reduces or eliminates an immune response to particular agents. It is used to describe the phenomenon underlying discrimination of self from non-self, suppressing allergic responses, allowing chronic infection instead of rejection and elimination, and preventing attack of fetuses by the maternal immune system. Typically, a change in the host, not the antigen, is implied. Though some pathogens can evolve to become less virulent in host-pathogen coevolution, tolerance does not refer to the change in the pathogen but can be used to describe the changes in host physiology. Immune tolerance also does not usually refer to artificially induced immunosuppression by corticosteroids, lymphotoxic chemotherapy agents, sublethal irradiation, etc. Nor does it refer to other types of non-reactivity such as immunological paralysis. In the latter two cases, the host's physiology is handicapped but not fundamentally changed.

Immune tolerance is formally differentiated into central or peripheral; however, alternative terms such as "natural" or "acquired" tolerance have at times been used to refer to establishment of tolerance by physiological means or by artificial, experimental, or pharmacological means. These two methods of categorization are sometimes confused, but are not equivalent—central or peripheral tolerance may be present naturally or induced experimentally. This difference is important to keep in mind.

== Central tolerance ==
Central tolerance refers to the tolerance established by deleting autoreactive lymphocyte clones before they develop into fully immunocompetent cells. It occurs during lymphocyte development in the thymus and bone marrow for T and B lymphocytes, respectively. In these tissues, maturing lymphocytes are exposed to self-antigens presented by medullary thymic epithelial cells and thymic dendritic cells, or bone marrow cells. Self-antigens are present due to endogenous expression, importation of antigen from peripheral sites via circulating blood, and in the case of thymic stromal cells, expression of proteins of other non-thymic tissues by the action of the transcription factor AIRE.

Those lymphocytes that have receptors that bind strongly to self-antigens are removed by induction of apoptosis of the autoreactive cells, or by induction of anergy, a state of non-activity. Weakly autoreactive B cells may also remain in a state of immunological ignorance where they simply do not respond to stimulation of their B cell receptor. Some weakly self-recognizing T cells are alternatively differentiated into natural regulatory T cells (nTreg cells), which act as sentinels in the periphery to calm down potential instances of T cell autoreactivity (see peripheral tolerance below).

The deletion threshold is much more stringent for T cells than for B cells since T cells alone can cause direct tissue damage. Furthermore, it is more advantageous for the organism to let its B cells recognize a wider variety of antigen so it can produce antibodies against a greater diversity of pathogens. Since the B cells can only be fully activated after confirmation by more self-restricted T cells that recognize the same antigen, autoreactivity is held in check.

This process of negative selection ensures that T and B cells that could initiate a potent immune response to the host's own tissues are eliminated while preserving the ability to recognize foreign antigens. It is the step in lymphocyte education that is key for preventing autoimmunity (entire process detailed here). Lymphocyte development and education is most active in fetal development but continues throughout life as immature lymphocytes are generated, slowing as the thymus degenerates and the bone marrow shrinks in adult life.

== Peripheral tolerance ==
Peripheral tolerance develops after T and B cells mature and enter the peripheral tissues and lymph nodes. It is established by a number of partly overlapping mechanisms that mostly involve control at the level of T cells, especially CD4+ helper T cells, which orchestrate immune responses and give B cells the confirmatory signals they need in order to produce antibodies. Inappropriate reactivity toward normal self-antigen that was not eliminated in the thymus can occur, since the T cells that leave the thymus are relatively but not completely safe. Some will have receptors (TCRs) that can respond to self-antigens that:

- are present in such high concentration outside the thymus that they can bind to "weak" receptors.
- the T cell did not encounter in the thymus (such as, tissue-specific molecules like those in the islets of Langerhans, brain, or spinal cord not expressed by AIRE in thymic tissues).

Those self-reactive T cells that escape intrathymic negative selection in the thymus can inflict cell injury unless they are deleted or effectively muzzled in the peripheral tissue chiefly by nTreg cells (see central tolerance above).

Appropriate reactivity toward certain antigens can also be quieted by induction of tolerance after repeated exposure, or exposure in a certain context. In these cases, there is a differentiation of naïve CD4+ helper T cells into induced Treg cells (iTreg cells) in the peripheral tissue or nearby lymphoid tissue (lymph nodes, mucosal-associated lymphoid tissue, etc.). This differentiation is mediated by IL-2 produced upon T cell activation, and TGF-β from any of a variety of sources, including tolerizing dendritic cells (DCs), other antigen presenting cells, or in certain conditions surrounding tissue.

Treg cells are not the only cells that mediate peripheral tolerance. Other regulatory immune cells include T cell subsets similar to but phenotypically distinct from Treg cells, including TR1 cells that make IL-10 but do not express Foxp3, TGF-β-secreting TH3 cells, as well as other less well-characterized cells that help establish a local tolerogenic environment. B cells also express CD22, a non-specific inhibitor receptor that dampens B cell receptor activation. A subset of B regulatory cells that makes IL-10 and TGF-β also exists. Some DCs can make Indoleamine 2,3-dioxygenase (IDO) that depletes the amino acid tryptophan needed by T cells to proliferate and thus reduce responsiveness. DCs also have the capacity to directly induce anergy in T cells that recognize antigen expressed at high levels and thus presented at steady-state by DCs. In addition, FasL expression by immune privileged tissues can result in activation-induced cell death of T cells.

=== nTreg vs. iTreg cells ===
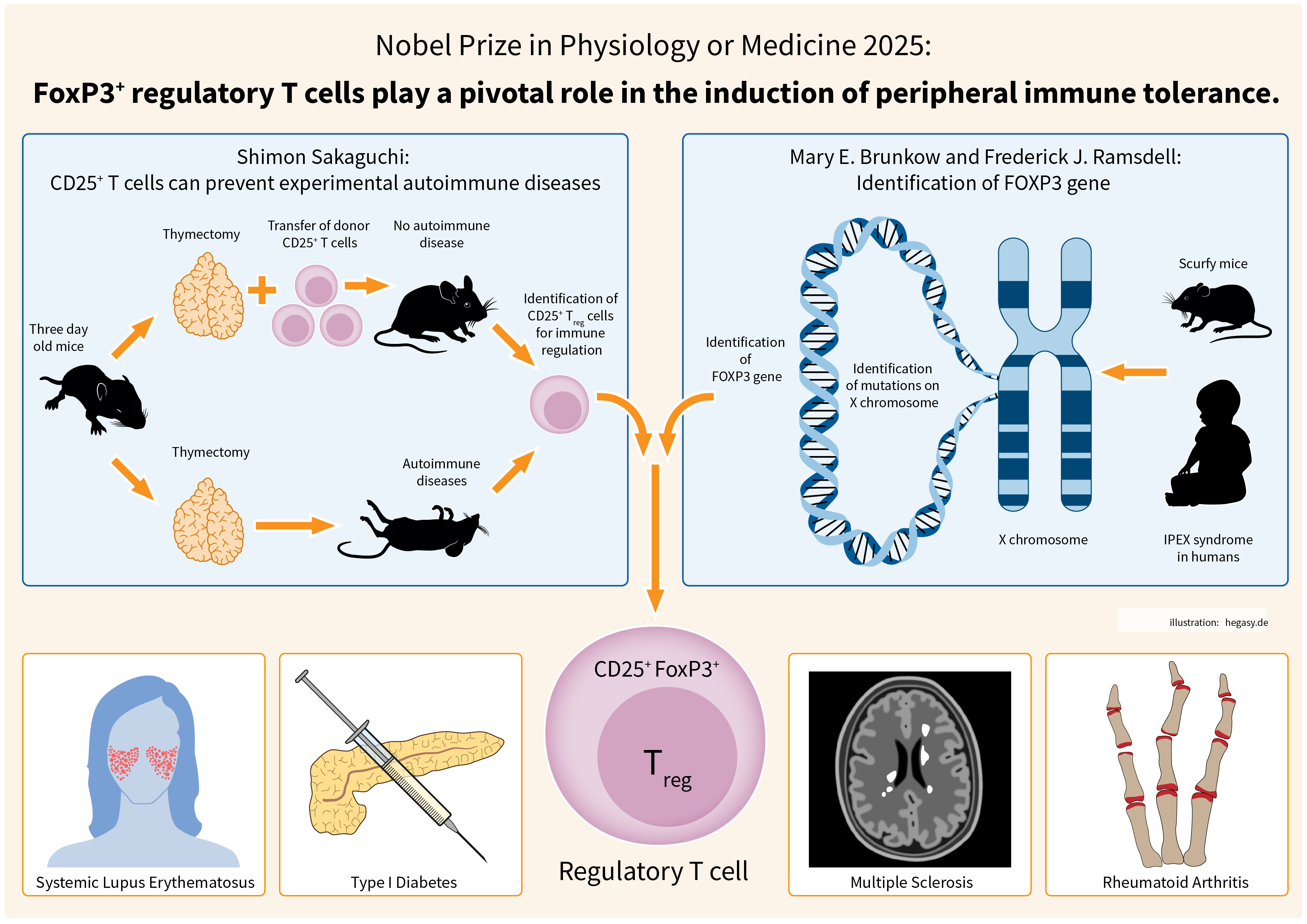
FoxP3 Treg cells play a pivotal role in peripheral immune tolerance - Nobel Prize in Physiology or Medicine 2025.

The involvement of T cells, later classified as Treg cells, in immune tolerance was recognized in 1995 when animal models showed that CD4+ CD25+ T cells were necessary and sufficient for the prevention of autoimmunity in mice and rats. Initial observations showed removal of the thymus of a newborn mouse resulted in autoimmunity, which could be rescued by transplantation of CD4+ T cells. A more specific depletion and reconstitution experiment established the phenotype of these cells as CD4+ and CD25+. Later in 2003, experiments showed that Treg cells were characterized by the expression of the Foxp3 transcription factor, which is responsible for the suppressive phenotype of these cells.

It was assumed that, since the presence of the Treg cells originally characterized was dependent on the neonatal thymus, these cells were thymically derived. By the mid-2000s, however, evidence was accruing of conversion of naïve CD4+ T cells to Treg cells outside of the thymus. These were later defined as induced or iTreg cells to contrast them with thymus-derived nTreg cells. Both types of Treg cells quieten autoreactive T cell signaling and proliferation by cell-contact-dependent and -independent mechanisms including:

- Contact-dependent:

- Granzyme or perforin secretion upon contact
- Upregulation of cAMP after contact, inducing anergy (reduced proliferation and IL-2 signaling)
- Interaction with B7 on T cells
- Downregulation of CD80/CD86 costimultory molecules on antigen presenting cells upon interaction with CTLA-4 or lymphocyte function-associated antigen 1 (LFA-1)

- Contact-independent

- Secretion of TGF-β, which sensitizes cells to suppression and promotes Treg-like cell differentiation
- Secretion of IL-10
- Cytokine absorption leading to cytokine deprivation-mediated apoptosis

nTreg cells and iTreg cells, however, have a few important distinguishing characteristics that suggest they have different physiological roles:

- nTreg cells develop in the thymus; iTreg cells develop outside the thymus in chronically inflamed tissue, lymph nodes, spleen, and gut-associated lymphoid tissue (GALT).
- nTreg cells develop from Foxp3- CD25+ CD4+ cells while iTreg cells develop from Foxp3+ CD25- CD4- cells (both become Foxp3+ CD25+CD4+).
- nTreg cells, when activated, require CD28 costimulation, while iTreg cells require CTLA-4 costimulation.
- nTreg cells are specific, modestly, for self-antigen while iTreg cells recognize allergens, commensal bacteria, tumor antigens, alloantigens, and self-antigens in inflamed tissue.

== Tolerance in physiology and medicine ==
=== Allograft tolerance ===
Immune recognition of non-self-antigens typically complicates transplantation and engrafting of foreign tissue from an organism of the same species (allografts), resulting in graft reaction. However, there are two general cases in which an allograft may be accepted. One is when cells or tissue are grafted to an immune-privileged site that is sequestered from immune surveillance (like in the eye or testes) or has strong molecular signals in place to prevent dangerous inflammation (like in the brain). The second is when a state of tolerance has been induced, either by previous exposure to the antigen of the donor in a manner that causes immune tolerance rather than sensitization in the recipient, or after chronic rejection. Long-term exposure to a foreign antigen from fetal development or birth may result in establishment of central tolerance, as was observed in Medawar's mouse-allograft experiments. In usual transplant cases, however, such early prior exposure is not possible. Nonetheless, a few patients can still develop allograft tolerance upon cessation of all exogenous immunosuppressive therapy, a condition referred to as operational tolerance. CD4+ Foxp3+ Treg cells, as well as CD8+ CD28- regulatory T cells that dampen cytotoxic responses to grafted organs, are thought to play a role. In addition, genes involved in NK cell and γδT cell function associated with tolerance have been implicated for liver transplant patients. The unique gene signatures of these patients implies their physiology may be predisposed toward immune tolerance.

=== Fetal development ===
The fetus has a different genetic makeup than the mother, as it also translates its father's genes, and is thus perceived as foreign by the maternal immune system. Women who have borne multiple children by the same father typically have antibodies against the father's red blood cell and major histocompatibility complex (MHC) proteins. However, the fetus usually is not rejected by the mother, making it essentially a physiologically tolerated allograft. It is thought that the placental tissues which interface with maternal tissues not only try to escape immunological recognition by downregulating identifying MHC proteins but also actively induce a marked peripheral tolerance. Placental trophoblast cells express a unique Human Leukocyte Antigen (HLA-G) that inhibits attack by maternal NK cells. These cells also express IDO, which represses maternal T cell responses by amino acid starvation. Maternal T cells specific for paternal antigens are also suppressed by tolerogenic DCs and activated iTregs or cross-reacting nTregs. Some maternal Treg cells also release soluble fibrinogen-like proteins 2 (sFGL2), which suppresses the function of DCs and macrophages involved in inflammation and antigen presentation to reactive T cells These mechanisms altogether establish an immune-privileged state in the placenta that protects the fetus. A break in this peripheral tolerance results in miscarriage and fetal loss. (for more information, see Immune tolerance in pregnancy).

=== The microbiome ===
The skin and digestive tract of humans and many other organisms is colonized with an ecosystem of microorganisms that is referred to as the microbiome. Though in mammals a number of defenses exist to keep the microbiota at a safe distance, including a constant sampling and presentation of microbial antigens by local DCs, most organisms do not react against commensal microorganisms and tolerate their presence. Reactions are mounted, however, to pathogenic microbes and microbes that breach physiological barriers(epithelium barriers). Peripheral mucosal immune tolerance, in particular, mediated by iTreg cells and tolerogenic antigen-presenting cells, is thought to be responsible for this phenomenon. In particular, specialized gut CD103+ DCs that produce both TGF-β and retinoic acid efficiently promotes the differentiation of iTreg cells in the gut lymphoid tissue. Foxp3- TR1 cells that make IL-10 are also enriched in the intestinal lining. Break in this tolerance is thought to underlie the pathogenesis of inflammatory bowel diseases like Crohn's disease and ulcerative colitis.

=== Oral tolerance ===
Oral tolerance refers to a specific type of peripheral tolerance induced by antigens given by mouth and exposed to the gut mucosa and its associated lymphoid tissues. The intestine harbours many non-self-antigens that are able to induce an immune reaction. The immune system in the gut needs to restrain from responding to these antigens to prevent constant inflammation. On the other hand, the thin intestinal wall is vulnerable to pathogenic penetration. The immune system must maintain its responsiveness to pathogenic antigens to prevent infections. The immune system has developed mechanisms in which orally ingested antigens can suppress following immune responses on a local and systemic level. Oral tolerance may have evolved to prevent hypersensitivity reactions to food proteins.

==== Mechanisms of oral tolerance for food antigens ====
The soluble antigens in the lumen of intestine are transported to dendritic cells in the lamina propria. After receiving an antigen these dendritic cells migrate to the mesenteric lymph nodes. Here they interact with naïve T cells and induce differentiation into regulatory T cells. The newly differentiated regulatory T cells travel to the lamina propria, where they suppress the immune reaction against the recognized antigens.

===== Antigen presentation to dendritic cells =====
Dendritic cells play a crucial role in establishing oral tolerance for food antigens. The dendritic cells in the intestines cannot directly sample the antigens, as they are located behind the epithelial wall. There are different mechanisms in which the dendritic cells come in contact with the food antigens Dissolved antigens can be taken up by enterocytes. The antigens are then partially degraded in the lysosomes. The partially degraded antigens are presented on MHCII after lysosome merging with MHCII carrying endosomes. The MHCII carrying vesicles are released on the basolateral surface of the enterocytes. Here dendritic cells can interact with the presented antigens.

Another pathway of soluble antigen transport occurs through goblet cells. Goblet cell-associated antigen passages (GAP) transfer low molecular weight soluble antigens to CD103+ dendritic cells. CD103+ dendritic cells are associated with tolerance induction.

CX3CR1+ macrophages extend in between enterocytes and directly take up antigens form the intestinal lumen. These macrophages are not capable of traveling to the mesenteric lymph nodes. They form gap junctions with CD103+ dendritic cells and transfer antigens to the dendritic cells.

===== Regulatory T cells =====
After antigen interaction the CD103+ dendritic cells travel to the mesenteric lymph nodes where they interact with their T cell population. Within the mesenteric lymph nodes the CD103+ dendritic cells will induce differentiation of the naïve T cell population into Foxp3+ regulatory T cells (iTregs). Under inflammatory conditions, CD103+ dendritic cells will induce Th1 cells instead. The local microenvironment determines if CD103+ dendritic cells act tolerogenic or immunogenic. The differentiation into regulatory T cells is dependent on TGFβ and retinoic acid. Retinoic acid is also programming the T cells to stay in the gut environment by inducing CCR9 and α4β7 expression. The mesenteric lymph node stromal cells also release retinoic acid and are required for gut localisation of the mesenteric lymph node T cell population. The differentiated regulatory T cells subsequently migrate to the lamina propria, where they multiply. CX3CR1+ macrophages present in this environment secrete IL-10, which is required for the expansion of the regulatory T cell population.

In the lamina propria the regulatory T cell population creates a tolerogenic environment to food antigens. It is known that tolerance to food antigens is systemic. The mechanism that establishes this systemic tolerance is not yet fully understood.

===== Other mechanisms of oral tolerance =====
Oral tolerance is also established by inducing anergy or deletion of antigen specific T cells. This process can take place in the liver. The liver is exposed to many food antigens through the portal vein and is therefore also a site of food tolerance induction. Upon high antigen exposure plasmacytoid dendritic cells from the liver and mesenteric lymph node can induce anergy or deletion of antigen specific T cells. Anergic T cells are hyporesponsive to their specific antigen.

==== Hypersensitivity and oral tolerance ====
The hypo-responsiveness induced by oral exposure is systemic and can reduce hypersensitivity reactions in certain cases. Records from 1829 indicate that American Indians would reduce contact hypersensitivity from poison ivy by consuming leaves of related Rhus species; however, contemporary attempts to use oral tolerance to ameliorate autoimmune diseases like rheumatoid arthritis and other hypersensitivity reactions have been mixed. The systemic effects of oral tolerance may be explained by the extensive recirculation of immune cells primed in one mucosal tissue in another mucosal tissue, allowing extension of mucosal immunity. The same probably occurs for cells mediating mucosal immune tolerance.

Allergy and hypersensitivity reactions in general are traditionally thought of as misguided or excessive reactions by the immune system, possibly due to broken or underdeveloped mechanisms of peripheral tolerance. Usually, Treg cells, TR1, and Th3 cells at mucosal surfaces suppress type 2 CD4 helper cells, mast cells, and eosinophils, which mediate allergic response. Deficits in Treg cells or their localization to mucosa have been implicated in asthma and atopic dermatitis. Attempts have been made to reduce hypersensitivity reactions by oral tolerance and other means of repeated exposure. Repeated administration of the allergen in slowly increasing doses, subcutaneously or sublingually appears to be effective for allergic rhinitis. Repeated administration of antibiotics, which can form haptens to cause allergic reactions, can also reduce antibiotic allergies in children.

=== The tumor microenvironment ===
Immune tolerance is an important means by which growing tumors, which have mutated proteins and altered antigen expression, prevent elimination by the host immune system. It is well recognized that tumors are a complex and dynamic population of cells composed of transformed cells as well as stromal cells, blood vessels, tissue macrophages, and other immune infiltrates. These cells and their interactions all contribute to the changing tumor microenvironment, which the tumor largely manipulates to be immunotolerant so as to avoid elimination. There is an accumulation of metabolic enzymes that suppress T cell proliferation and activation, including IDO and arginase, and high expression of tolerance-inducing ligands like FasL, PD-1, CTLA-4, and B7. Pharmacologic monoclonal antibodies targeted against some of these ligands has been effective in treating cancer. Tumor-derived vesicles known as exosomes have also been implicated promoting differentiation of iTreg cells and myeloid derived suppressor cells (MDSCs), which also induce peripheral tolerance. In addition to promoting immune tolerance, other aspects of the microenvironment aid in immune evasion and induction of tumor-promoting inflammation e.g., tumors with low expression of distinguishing antigens can directly cause creation of tolerized CD8+T cells thereby leading to immunotherapy resistance.

== Evolution ==
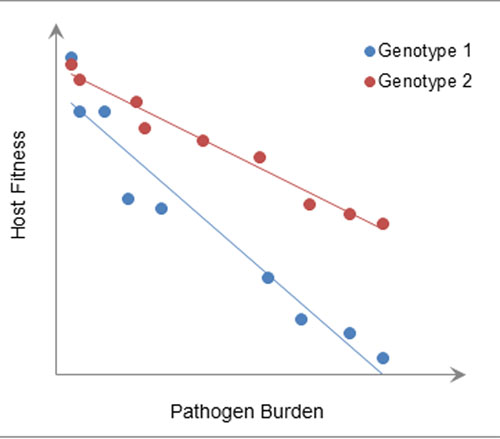
Schematic of the reaction norm of tolerance (after). Organisms of genotype 2 are considered more tolerant to the pathogen than organisms of genotype 1.

Though the exact evolutionary rationale behind the development of immunological tolerance is not completely known, it is thought to allow organisms to adapt to antigenic stimuli that will consistently be present instead of expending considerable resources fighting it off repeatedly. Tolerance in general can be thought of as an alternative defense strategy that focuses on minimizing impact of an invader on host fitness, instead of on destroying and eliminating the invader. Such efforts may have a prohibitive cost on host fitness. In plants, where the concept was originally used, tolerance is defined as a reaction norm of host fitness over a range of parasite burdens, and can be measured from the slope of the line fitting these data. Immune tolerance may constitute one aspect of this defense strategy, though other types of tissue tolerance have been described.

The advantages of immune tolerance, in particular, may be seen in experiments with mice infected with malaria, in which more tolerant mice have higher fitness at greater pathogen burdens. In addition, development of immune tolerance would have allowed organisms to reap the benefits of having a robust commensal microbiome, such as increased nutrient absorption and decreased colonization by pathogenic bacteria.

Though it seems that the existence of tolerance is mostly adaptive, allowing an adjustment of the immune response to a level appropriate for the given stressor, it comes with important evolutionary disadvantages. Some infectious microbes take advantage of existing mechanisms of tolerance to avoid detection and/or elimination by the host immune system. Induction of regulatory T cells, for instance, has been noted in infections with Helicobacter pylori, Listeria monocytogenes, Brugia malayi, and other worms and parasites. Another important disadvantage of the existence of tolerance may be susceptibility to cancer progression. Treg cells inhibit anti-tumor NK cells. The injection of Treg cells specific for a tumor antigen also can reverse experimentally-mediated tumor rejection based on that same antigen. The prior existence of immune tolerance mechanisms due to selection for its fitness benefits facilitates its utilization in tumor growth.

=== Tradeoffs between immune tolerance and resistance ===
Immune tolerance contrasts with resistance. Upon exposure to a foreign antigen, either the antigen is eliminated by the standard immune response (resistance), or the immune system adapts to the pathogen, promoting immune tolerance instead.

Resistance typically protects the host at the expense of the parasite, while tolerance reduces harm to the host without having any direct negative effects on the parasite. Each strategy has its unique costs and benefits for host fitness:

	Costs	Benefits
Elimination (resistance)	Pain, swelling, and disruption of tissue function by inflammation.; Tissue damage by inflammatory mediators (immunopathology); High energy cost; Risk of autoimmunity, hypersensitivity, allergy	Reduces pathogen burden; Neutralizes toxins and eliminates dangerous organisms; Prevents parasitism
Tolerance	Direct damage by pathogen (toxins, digestion, etc.); Energy and resources lost to pathogen	Reduced tissue damage from immune response; Less selection pressure on pathogens for resistance; Promotes commensalism; Lower energy cost

Evolution works to optimize host fitness, so whether elimination or tolerance occurs depends on which would benefit the organism most in a given scenario. If the antigen is from a rare, dangerous invader, the costs of tolerating its presence are high and it is more beneficial to the host to eliminate it. Conversely, if experience (of the organism or its ancestors) has shown that the antigen is innocuous, then it would be more beneficial to tolerate the presence of the antigen rather than pay the costs of inflammation.

Despite having mechanisms for both immune resistance and tolerance, any one organism may be overall more skewed toward a tolerant or resistant phenotype depending on individual variation in both traits due to genetic and environmental factors. In mice infected with malaria, different genetic strains of mice fall neatly along a spectrum of being more tolerant but less resistant or more resistant but less tolerant. Patients with autoimmune diseases also often have a unique gene signature and certain environmental risk factors that predispose them to disease. This may have implications for current efforts to identify why certain individuals may be disposed to or protected against autoimmunity, allergy, inflammatory bowel disease, and other such diseases.

== See also ==
- Evolutionary medicine § tradeoffs
- Immunotherapy
- Infectious tolerance
- Mithridatism
- Plant tolerance to herbivory
