= T helper cell =

Type of immune cell

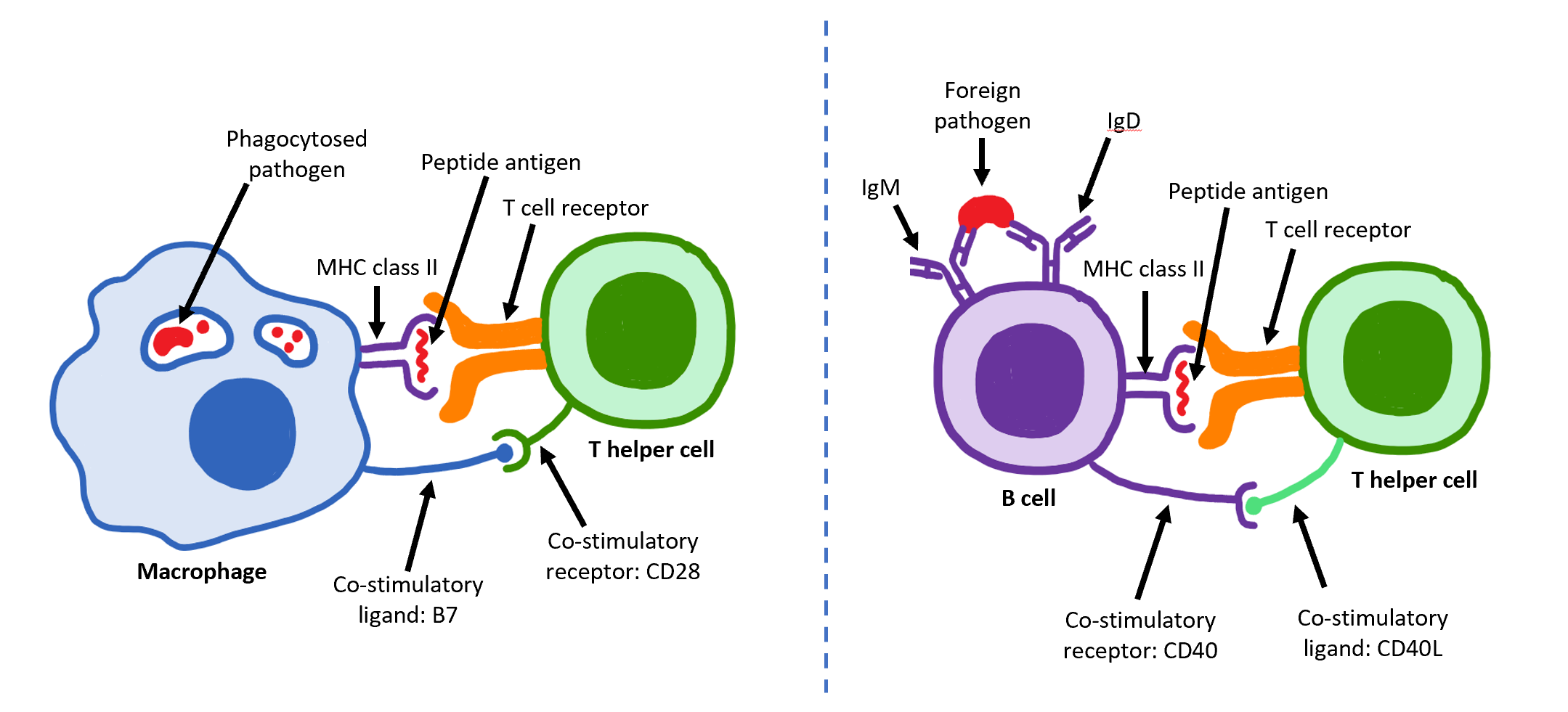
Activation of macrophage or B cell by T helper cell

The T helper cells (T_{h} cells), also known as CD4^{+} cells or CD4-positive cells, are a type of T cell that play an important role in the adaptive immune system. They aid the activity of other immune cells by releasing cytokines. They are considered essential in B cell antibody class switching, breaking cross-tolerance in dendritic cells, in the activation and growth of cytotoxic T cells, and in maximizing bactericidal activity of phagocytes such as macrophages and neutrophils. CD4^{+} cells are mature T_{h} cells that express the surface protein CD4. Genetic variation in regulatory elements expressed by CD4^{+} cells determines susceptibility to a broad class of autoimmune diseases.

== Structure and function ==
T_{h} cells contain and release cytokines to aid other immune cells. Cytokines are small protein mediators that alter the behavior of target cells that express receptors for those cytokines. These cells help polarize the immune response depending on the nature of the immunological insult (for example; virus vs. extracellular bacterium vs. intracellular bacterium vs. helminth vs. fungus vs. protist).

Mature T_{h} cells express the surface protein CD4 and are referred to as CD4^{+} T cells. CD4^{+} T cells are generally treated as having a pre-defined role as helper T cells within the immune system. For example, when an antigen-presenting cell displays a peptide antigen on MHC class II proteins, a CD4^{+} cell will aid those cells through a combination of cell to cell interactions, e.g., CD40 (protein) and CD40L, and through cytokines.

T_{h} cells are not a monolithic immunological entity because they are diverse in terms of function and their interaction with partner cells. In general, mature naive T cells are stimulated by professional antigen presenting cells to acquire an effector function. These are defined by the presence of a lineage-determining (or lineage-specifying) transcription factor (also called master regulator, though the term has been criticized for being too reductive). The loss of function in a lineage specifying transcription factor results in the absence of the corresponding class of helper T cell which can be devastating for the health of the host.

== Activation of naive T helper cells ==
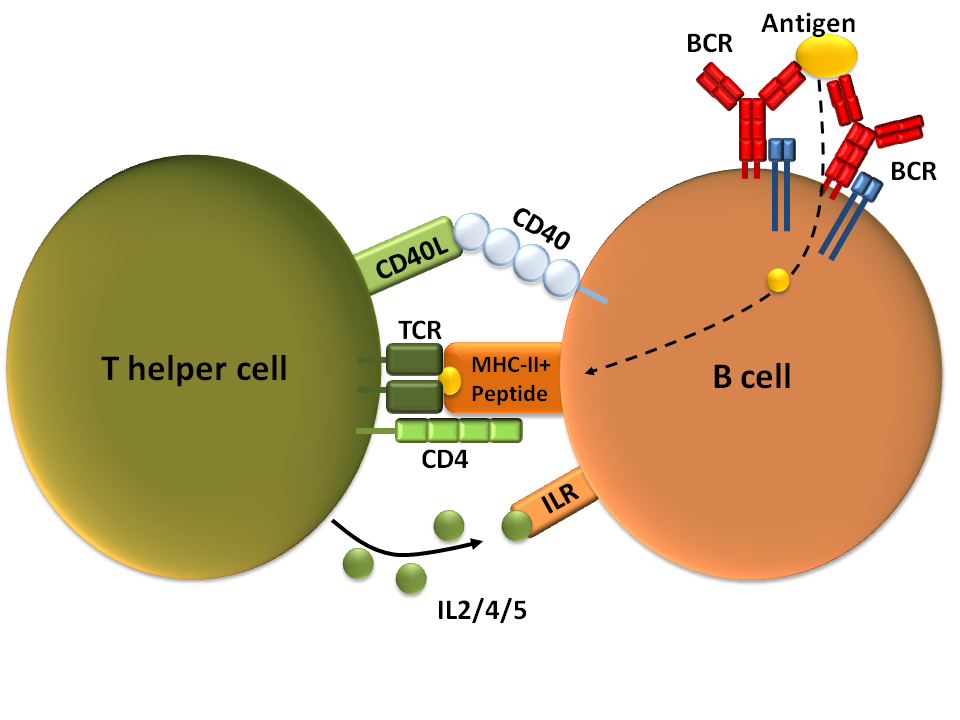
T-cell dependent B-cell activation, showing TH2-cell (left) B-cell (right) and several interaction molecules self-made according to Janeway et al, Immunologie (Berlin, 2002)

Following development in the thymus, these cells (termed recent thymic emigrants (RTE)) egress from the thymus and home to secondary lymphoid organs (SLO; spleen and lymph nodes). Of note, only a very small minority of T cells egresses from the thymus (estimates commonly range from 1–5% but some experts feel even this is generous). Maturation of RTE in SLO results in the generation of mature naive T cells (naïve meaning they have never been exposed to the antigen that they are programmed to respond to), but naive T cells now lack or have downregulated (reduced) expression of the RTE-related surface markers, such as CD31, PTK7, Complement Receptor 1 and 2 (CR1, CR2) and the production of interleukin 8 (IL-8). Like all T cells, they express the T cell receptor-CD3 complex. The T cell receptor (TCR) consists of both constant and variable regions. The variable region determines what antigen the T cell can respond to. CD4^{+} T cells have TCRs with an affinity for Class II MHC, and CD4 is involved in determining MHC affinity during maturation in the thymus. Class II MHC proteins are generally only found on the surface of professional antigen-presenting cells (APCs). Professional antigen-presenting cells are primarily dendritic cells, macrophages and B cells, although dendritic cells are the only cell group that expresses MHC Class II constitutively (at all times). Some APCs also bind native (or unprocessed) antigens to their surface, such as follicular dendritic cells (these are not the same type of cells as the dendritic cells of the immune system but rather have a non-hematopoietic origin, and in general lack MHC Class II, meaning they are not true professional antigen-presenting cells; however, follicular dendritic cells may acquire MHC Class II proteins via exosomes that become attached to them). T cells require antigens to be processed into short fragments which form linear epitopes on MHC Class II (in the case of helper T cells because they express CD4) or MHC class I (in the case of cytotoxic T cells which express CD8). MHC Class II binding pockets are flexible with respect to the length of the peptides they hold. Generally, there are 9 core amino acid residues with several flanking amino acids which form a length of about 12–16 amino acids total but have been known to hold as many as 25 amino acids. By comparison, MHC Class I proteins are usually 9-10 peptides long. The activation of naive T cells is commonly explained in terms of the 3-signal model, elaborated upon below.

=== Activation (signal 1) ===
Antigen presentation stimulates naïve CD8+ and CD4+ T cells to become mature "cytotoxic" CD8+ cells and "helper" CD4+ cells respectively .

During an immune response, professional antigen-presenting cells (APCs) endocytose antigens (typically bacteria or viruses), which undergo processing, then travel from the infection site to the lymph nodes. Typically, the APC responsible is a dendritic cell. If the antigen expresses appropriate molecular patterns (sometimes known as signal 0), it can induce maturation of the dendritic cell which results in enhanced expression of costimulatory molecules needed to activate T cells (see signal 2) and MHC Class II. Once at the lymph nodes, the APCs begin to present antigen peptides that are bound to Class II MHC, allowing CD4^{+} T cells that express the specific TCRs against the peptide/MHC complex to activate.

When a T_{h} cell encounters and recognizes the antigen on an APC, the TCR-CD3 complex binds strongly to the peptide-MHC complex present on the surface of professional APCs. CD4, a co-receptor of the TCR complex, also binds to a different section of the MHC molecule. It is estimated that approximately 50 of these interactions are required for the activation of a helper T cell and assemblies known as microclusters have been observed forming between the TCR-CD3-CD4 complexes of the T cell and the MHC Class II proteins of the dendritic cell at the zone of contact. When these all come together, the CD4 is able to recruit a kinase called Lck which phosphorylates immunoreceptor tyrosine-based activation motifs (ITAMs) present on the CD3 gamma, delta, epsilon, and zeta chains. The protein ZAP-70 can bind these phosphorylated ITAMs via its SH2 domain and then itself becomes phosphorylated, wherein it orchestrates the downstream signaling required for T cell activation. Lck activation is controlled by the opposing actions of CD45 and Csk. CD45 activates Lck by dephosphorylating a tyrosine in its C-terminal tail, while Csk phosphorylates Lck at that site. The loss of CD45 produces a form of SCID because failure to activate Lck prevents appropriate T cell signaling. Memory T cells also make use of this pathway and have higher levels of Lck expressed and the function of Csk is inhibited in these cells.

The binding of the antigen-MHC to the TCR complex and CD4 may also help the APC and the T_{h} cell adhere during T_{h} cell activation, but the integrin protein LFA-1 on the T cell and ICAM on the APC are the primary molecules of adhesion in this cell interaction.

It is unknown what role the relatively bulky extracellular region of CD45 plays during cell interactions, but CD45 has various isoforms that change in size depending on the T_{h} cell's activation and maturation status. For example, CD45 shortens in length following T_{h} activation (CD45RA^{+} to CD45RO^{+}), but whether this change in length influences activation is unknown. It has been proposed that the larger CD45RA may decrease the accessibility of the T cell receptor for the antigen-MHC molecule, thereby necessitating an increase in the affinity (and specificity) of the T cell for activation. However, once the activation has occurred, CD45 shortens, allowing easier interactions and activation as an effector T helper cell.

=== Survival (signal 2) ===
Having received the first TCR/CD3 signal, the naïve T cell must activate a second independent biochemical pathway, known as Signal 2. This verification step is a protective measure to ensure that a T cell is responding to a foreign antigen. If this second signal is not present during initial antigen exposure, the T cell presumes that it is auto-reactive. This results in the cell becoming anergic (anergy is generated from the unprotected biochemical changes of Signal 1). Anergic cells will not respond to any antigen in the future, even if both signals are present later on. These cells are generally believed to circulate throughout the body with no value until they undergo apoptosis.

The second signal involves an interaction between CD28 on the CD4^{+} T cell and the proteins CD80 (B7.1) or CD86 (B7.2) on the professional APCs. Both CD80 and CD86 activate the CD28 receptor. These proteins are also known as co-stimulatory molecules.

Although the verification stage is necessary for the activation of naïve helper T cells, the importance of this stage is best demonstrated during the similar activation mechanism of CD8^{+} cytotoxic T cells. As naïve CD8^{+} T cells have no true bias towards foreign sources, these T cells must rely on the activation of CD28 for confirmation that they recognize a foreign antigen (as CD80/CD86 is only expressed by active APC's). CD28 plays an important role in decreasing the risk of T cell auto-immunity against host antigens.

Once the naïve T cell has both pathways activated, the biochemical changes induced by Signal 1 are altered, allowing the cell to activate instead of undergoing anergy. The second signal is then obsolete; only the first signal is necessary for future activation. This is also true for memory T cells, which is one example of learned immunity. Faster responses occur upon reinfection because memory T cells have already undergone confirmation and can produce effector cells much sooner.

=== Differentiation (signal 3) ===
Once the two-signal activation is complete the T helper cell (T_{h}) then allows itself to proliferate. It achieves this by releasing a potent T cell growth factor called interleukin 2 (IL-2) which acts upon itself in an autocrine fashion. Activated T cells also produce the alpha sub-unit of the IL-2 receptor (CD25 or IL-2R), enabling a fully functional receptor that can bind with IL-2, which in turn activates the T cell's proliferation pathways.

The autocrine or paracrine secretion of IL-2 can bind to that same T_{h} cell or neighboring T_{h}'s via the IL-2R thus driving proliferation and clonal expansion. The T_{h} cells receiving both signals of activation and proliferation will then become T_{h}0 (T helper 0) cells that secrete IL-2, IL-4 and interferon gamma (IFN-γ). The T_{h}0 cells will then differentiate into T_{h}1 or T_{h}2 cells depending on cytokine environment. IFN-γ drives T_{h}1 cell production while IL-10 and IL-4 inhibit T_{h}1 cell production. Conversely, IL-4 drives T_{h}2 cell production and IFN-γ inhibits T_{h}2 cells. These cytokines are pleiotropic and carry out many other functions of the immune response.

== Effector function ==
In 1991, three groups reported discovering CD154, which is the molecular basis of T cell helper function. Seth Lederman at Columbia University generated a murine monoclonal antibody, 5c8 that inhibited contact-dependent T cell helper function in human cells which characterized the 32 kDa surface protein transiently expressed on CD4^{+} T cells. Richard Armitage at Immunex cloned a cDNA encoding CD154 by screening an expression library with CD40-Ig. Randolph Noelle at Dartmouth Medical School generated an antibody that bound a 39 kDa protein on murine T cells and inhibited helper function.

== Determination of the effector T cell response ==
Helper T cells are capable of influencing a variety of immune cells, and the T cell response generated (including the extracellular signals such as cytokines) can be essential for a successful outcome from infection. In order to be effective, helper T cells must determine which cytokines will allow the immune system to be most useful or beneficial for the host. Understanding exactly how helper T cells respond to immune challenges is currently of major interest in immunology, because such knowledge may be very useful in the treatment of disease and in increasing the effectiveness of vaccination.

=== T_{h}1/T_{h}2 model ===
Proliferating naive CD4^{+} cells differentiate into a number of effector T-cell subtypes. Historically, the first division of CD4^{+} cells recognized by researchers were T helper cell types 1 and 2, or Th_{1} and Th_{2}. This has come to be referred to as the T_{h}1/T_{h}2 model. There are now a variety of recognized CD4^{+} subtypes such as Th_{9}, Th_{17}, T_{reg} and T_{fh}.

T_{h}1 helper cells lead to an increased cell-mediated response (primarily by macrophages and cytotoxic T cells), typically against intracellular bacteria and protozoa. They are triggered by the polarising cytokine IL-12 and their effector cytokines are IFN-γ and IL-2. The main effector cells of T_{h}1 immunity are macrophages as well as CD8 T cells, IgG B cells, and IFN-γ CD4 T cells. The key T_{h}1 transcription factors are STAT4 and T-bet. IFN-γ secreted by CD4 T cells can activate macrophages to phagocytose and digest intracellular bacteria and protozoa. In addition, IFN-γ can activate iNOS (inducible nitric oxide synthase) to produce nitric oxide free radicals to directly kill intracellular bacteria and protozoa. T_{h}1 overactivation against autoantigens will cause Type IV or delayed-type hypersensitivity reaction. Tuberculin reaction and Type 1 diabetes belong to this category of autoimmunity.

T_{h}2 helper cells lead to a humoral immune response, typically against extracellular parasites such as helminths. They are triggered by the polarising cytokines IL-4 and IL-2, and their effector cytokines are IL-4, IL-5, IL-9, IL-10, IL-13 and IL-25. The main effector cells are eosinophils, basophils, and mast cells as well as B cells, and IL-4/IL-5 CD4 T cells. The key T_{h}2 transcription factors are STAT6 and GATA3. IL-4 is the positive feedback cytokine for T_{h}2 cells differentiation. Besides, IL-4 stimulates B-cells to produce IgE antibodies, which in turn stimulate mast cells to release histamine, serotonin, and leukotriene to cause broncho-constriction, intestinal peristalsis, gastric fluid acidification to expel helminths. IL-5 from CD4 T cells will activate eosinophils to attack helminths. IL-10 suppresses T_{h}1 cells differentiation and function of dendritic cells. T_{h}2 overactivation against antigen will cause Type I hypersensitivity which is an allergic reaction mediated by IgE. Allergic rhinitis, atopic dermatitis, and asthma belong to this category of overactivation . In addition to expressing different cytokines, T_{h}2 cells also differ from T_{h}1 cells in their cell surface glycans (oligosaccharides), which makes them less susceptible to some inducers of cell death.

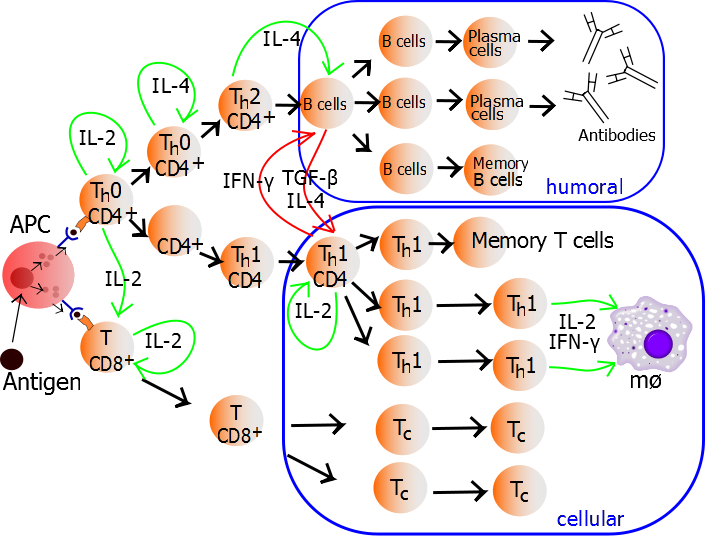
T_{h}1/T_{h}2 Model for helper T cells. An antigen is ingested and processed by an APC. It presents fragments from it to T cells. The upper, T_{h}0, is a T helper cell. The fragment is presented to it by MHC2. IFN-γ, interferon γ; TGF-β, transforming growth factor β; mø, macrophage; IL-2, interleukin 2; IL-4, interleukin 4

Th1/Th2 dichotomy
	Type 1/ T_{h}1	Type 2/ T_{h}2
Main partner cell type	Macrophage, CD8^{+} T cell	B-cell, eosinophil, mast cell
Cytokines produced	Interferon gamma (IFNγ) and TNF-β. Interleukin 2 and interleukin 10 production has been reported in activated T_{h}1 cell.	Interleukin 4, interleukin 5, interleukin 6, interleukin 9, interleukin 10, interleukin 13
Immune stimulation promoted	Cellular immune system. Maximizes the killing efficacy of the macrophages and the proliferation of cytotoxic CD8^{+} T cells. Also promotes the production of IgG, an opsonizing antibody.	Humoral immune system. Stimulates B-cells into proliferation, to induce B-cell antibody class switching, and to increase neutralizing antibody production (IgG, IgM and IgA as well as IgE antibodies).
Other functions	The Type 1 cytokine IFNγ increases the production of interleukin 12 by dendritic cells and macrophages, and via positive feedback, IL-12 stimulates the production of IFNγ in helper T cells, thereby promoting the T_{h}1 profile. IFNγ also inhibits the production of cytokines such as interleukin 4, an important cytokine associated with the Type 2 response, and thus it also acts to preserve its own response.	The Type 2 response promotes its own profile using two different cytokines. Interleukin 4 acts on helper T cells to promote the production of T_{h}2 cytokines (including itself; it is auto-regulatory), while interleukin 10 (IL-10) inhibits a variety of cytokines including interleukin 2 and IFNγ in helper T cells and IL-12 in dendritic cells and macrophages. The combined action of these two cytokines suggests that once the T cell has decided to produce these cytokines, that decision is preserved (and also encourages other T cells to do the same).

While we know about the types of cytokine patterns helper T cells tend to produce, we understand less about how the patterns themselves are decided. Various evidence suggests that the type of APC presenting the antigen to the T cell has a major influence on its profile. Other evidence suggests that the concentration of antigen presented to the T cell during primary activation influences its choice. The presence of some cytokines (such as the ones mentioned above) will also influence the response that will eventually be generated, but our understanding is nowhere near complete.

=== T_{h}17 helper cells ===
T_{h}17 helper cells are a subset of T helper cells developmentally distinct from T_{h}1 and T_{h}2 lineages. T_{h}17 cells produce interleukin 17 (IL-17), a pro-inflammatory substance, as well as interleukins 21 and 22. This means that T_{h}17 cells are especially good at fighting extracellular pathogens and fungi, particularly during mucocutaneous immunity against Candida spp.

=== THαβ helper cells ===
THαβ helper cells provide the host immunity against viruses. Their differentiation is triggered by IFN α/β or IL-10. Their key effector cytokine is IL-10. Their main effector cells are NK cells as well as CD8 T cells, IgG B cells, and IL-10 CD4 T cells. The key THαβ transcription factors are STAT1 and STAT3 as well as IRFs. IL-10 from CD4 T cells activate NK cells' ADCC to apoptose virus-infected cells and to induce host as well as viral DNA fragmentation. IFN alpha/beta can suppress transcription to avoid virus replication and transmission. Overactivation of THαβ against autoantigen will cause type 2 antibody-dependent cytotoxic hypersensitivity. Myasthenia gravis or Graves' disease belong to this category.

=== Limitations to the T_{h}1/T_{h}2 model ===
The interactions between cytokines from the T_{h}1/T_{h}2 model can be more complicated in some animals. For example, the T_{h}2 cytokine IL-10 inhibits cytokine production of both T_{h} subsets in humans. Human IL-10 (hIL-10) suppresses the proliferation and cytokine production of all T cells and the activity of macrophages, but continues to stimulate plasma cells, ensuring that antibody production still occurs. As such, hIL-10 is not believed to truly promote the T_{h}2 response in humans, but acts to prevent over-stimulation of helper T cells while still maximising the production of antibodies.There are also other types of T cells that can influence the expression and activation of helper T cells, such as natural regulatory T cells, along with less common cytokine profiles such as the T_{h}3 subset of helper T cells. Terms such as "regulatory" and "suppression" have become ambiguous after the discovery that helper CD4^{+} T cells are also capable of regulating (and suppressing) their own responses outside of dedicated regulatory T cells.

One major difference between regulatory T cells and effector T cells is that regulatory T cells typically serve to modulate and deactivate the immune response, while effector T cell groups usually begin with immune-promoting cytokines and then switch to inhibitory cytokines later in their life cycle. The latter is a feature of T_{h}3 cells, which transform into a regulatory subset after its initial activation and cytokine production.

Both regulatory T cells and T_{h}3 cells produce the cytokine transforming growth factor-beta (TGF-β) and IL-10. Both cytokines are inhibitory to helper T cells; TGF-β suppresses the activity of most of the immune system. There is evidence to suggest that TGF-β may not suppress activated Th2 cells as effectively as it might suppress naive cells, but it is not typically considered a Th2 cytokine.

The novel characterisation of another T helper subtype, T helper 17 cells (T_{h}17) has cast further doubt on the basic T_{h}1/T_{h}2 model. These IL-17 producing cells were initially described as a pathogenic population implicated in autoimmunity but are now thought to have their own distinct effector and regulatory functions. Of note, some evidence suggest that functional plasticity is an intrinsic capacity of T helper cells. Indeed, a study in mice demonstrated that T_{h}17 cells transform into T_{h}1 cells in vivo. A subsequent study furthermore showed that extensive T helper cell plasticity is also prominent in humans.

Many of the cytokines in this article are also expressed by other immune cells (see individual cytokines for details), and it is becoming clear that while the original T_{h}1/T_{h}2 model is enlightening and gives insight into the functions of helper T cells, it is far too simple to define its entire role or actions. Some immunologists question the model completely, as some in vivo studies suggest that individual helper T cells usually do not match the specific cytokine profiles of the T_{h} model, and many cells express cytokines from both profiles. That said, the T_{h} model has still played an important part in developing our understanding of the roles and behaviour of helper T cells and the cytokines they produce during an immune response.

Studies by Stockinger et al. revealed that another T helper subset may exist. Th9 cells are claimed to be an IL9 (interleukin 9)–producing T cell subset focused on defending helminth infections.

== Metabolic Regulation of T Helper Cells ==
Recent studies have demonstrated that cellular metabolism plays a decisive role in determining the differentiation pathways of T helper cells. When CD4⁺ T cells rely predominantly on glycolysis, they are more likely to differentiate into Th17 cells, which are known for producing IL-17 and contributing to pro-inflammatory immune responses. In contrast, when oxidative phosphorylation is the major metabolic program used by these cells, they preferentially develop into regulatory T cells (Tregs), which suppress excessive inflammation and help maintain immune tolerance (Shi et al., 2011). This metabolic regulation acts as an internal checkpoint that influences how the immune system responds to infection, inflammation, and tissue damage. Because disruptions in these energy pathways can shift the balance between Th17 cells and Tregs, researchers are investigating metabolic interventions as potential treatments for autoimmune diseases such as multiple sclerosis, inflammatory bowel disease, and rheumatoid arthritis.

== Memory T cell ==
Historically, memory T cells were thought to belong to either the effector or central memory subtypes, each with their own distinguishing set of cell surface markers. Central memory T cells reside in the lymph nodes while effector memory T cells lack the C-C chemokine receptor type 7 (CCR7) and L-selectin (CD62L) receptors, which prevents them from trafficking to the lymph nodes.

Additional populations of memory T cells are now known to exist. These include tissue-resident memory T (Trm) cells and virtual memory T cells. The single unifying theme for all memory T cell subtypes is that they are long-lived and can expand quickly to large numbers of effector T cells upon encountering their cognate antigen. By this mechanism they provide the immune system with "memory" against previously encountered pathogens.

== Role in disease ==
Considering the diverse and important role helper T cells play in the immune system, it is not surprising that these cells often influence the immune response against disease. They also occasionally generate non-beneficial responses. Very rarely, the helper T cell response could lead to the death of the host.

=== Hypersensitivity ===
The immune system must achieve a balance of sensitivity in order to respond to foreign antigens without responding to the antigens of the host itself. When the immune system responds to very low levels of antigen that it usually shouldn't respond to, a hypersensitivity response occurs. Hypersensitivity is believed to be the cause of allergy and some auto-immune disease.

Hypersensitivity reactions can be divided into four types:

- Type 1 hypersensitivity includes common immune disorders such as asthma, allergic rhinitis (hay fever), eczema, urticaria (hives) and anaphylaxis. These reactions all involve IgE antibodies, which require a T_{h}2 response during helper T cell development. Preventive treatments, such as corticosteroids and montelukast, focus on suppressing mast cells or other allergic cells; T cells do not play a primary role during the actual inflammatory response. It's important to note that the numeral allocation of hypersensitivity "types" does not correlate (and is completely unrelated) to the "response" in the T_{h} model.
- Type 2 and Type 3 hypersensitivity both involve complications from auto-immune or low affinity antibodies. In both of these reactions, T cells may play an accomplice role in generating these auto-specific antibodies, although some of these reactions under Type 2 hypersensitivity would be considered normal in a healthy immune system (for example, Rhesus factor reactions during child-birth is a normal immune response against child antigens). The understanding of the role of helper T cells in these responses is limited but it is generally thought that T_{h}2 cytokines would promote such disorders. For example, studies have suggested that lupus (SLE) and other auto-immune diseases of similar nature can be linked to the production of T_{h}2 cytokines.
- Type 4 hypersensitivity, also known as delayed type hypersensitivity, are caused via the over-stimulation of immune cells, commonly lymphocytes and macrophages, resulting in chronic inflammation and cytokine release. Antibodies do not play a direct role in this allergy type. T cells play an important role in this hypersensitivity, as they activate against the stimulus itself and promote the activation of other cells; particularly macrophages via T_{h}1 cytokines.

Other cellular hypersensitivities include cytotoxic T cell mediated auto-immune disease, and a similar phenomenon; transplant rejection. Helper T cells are required to fuel the development of these diseases. In order to create sufficient auto-reactive killer T cells, interleukin-2 must be produced, and this is supplied by CD4^{+} T cells. CD4^{+} T cells can also stimulate cells such as natural killer cells and macrophages via cytokines such as interferon-gamma, encouraging these cytotoxic cells to kill host cells in certain circumstances.

The mechanism that killer T cells use during auto-immunity is almost identical to their response against viruses, and some viruses have been accused of causing auto-immune diseases such as Type 1 diabetes mellitus. Cellular auto-immune disease occurs because the host antigen recognition systems fail, and the immune system believes, by mistake, that a host antigen is foreign. As a result, the CD8^{+} T cells treat the host cell presenting that antigen as infected, and go on to destroy all host cells (or in the case of transplant rejection, transplant organ) that express that antigen.

Some of this section is a simplification. Many auto-immune diseases are more complex. A well-known example is rheumatoid arthritis, where both antibodies and immune cells are known to play a role in the pathology. Generally the immunology of most auto-immune diseases is not well understood.

=== HIV infection ===
Perhaps the best example of the importance of CD4^{+} T cells is demonstrated with human immunodeficiency virus (HIV) infection. HIV mainly targets lymphoid CD4^{+} T cells, but can infect other cells that express CD4 such as macrophages and dendritic cells (both groups express CD4 at low levels).

It has been proposed that during the non-symptomatic phase of HIV infection, the virus has a relatively low affinity towards T cells (and has a higher affinity for macrophages), resulting in a slow kill rate of CD4^{+} T cells by the immune system. This is initially compensated for via the production of new helper T cells from the thymus (originally from the bone marrow). Once the virus becomes lymphotropic (or T-tropic) however, it begins to infect CD4^{+} T cells far more efficiently (likely due to a change in the co-receptors it binds to during infection), and the immune system is overwhelmed. Studies suggest that only ~5% of the lymphoid-derived CD4 T cells targeted by HIV are permissive and become productively infected with the virus. More than 95% of the CD4 T cells that die are resting and are unable to support productive infection. These cells undergo abortive infection with HIV. Cell death is triggered when the host cell detects HIV foreign DNA intermediates and initiates a suicidal death pathway in an attempt to protect the host, leading to caspase-1 activation in inflammasomes, thus causing pyroptosis (a highly inflammatory form of programmed cell death).

At this point chronic inflammation ensues, and functional CD4^{+} T cell levels begin to decrease, eventually to a point where the CD4^{+} T cell population is too small to recognize the full range of antigens that could potentially be detected. The depletion of CD4 T cells and the development of chronic inflammation are signature processes in HIV pathogenesis that propel progression to acquired immune deficiency syndrome (AIDS). CD4 T cell depleted to the cell count of less than 200cell/μL in blood during AIDS allows various pathogens to escape T cell recognition, thus allowing opportunistic infections that would normally elicit a helper T cell response to bypass the immune system. While these complete bypass situations only occur when the helper T cell response is absolutely necessary for infection clearance, most infections increase in severity and/or duration because the immune system's helper T cells provide less efficient immune response.

Two components of the immune system are particularly affected in AIDS, due to its CD4^{+} T cell dependency:

1. CD8^{+} T cells are not stimulated as effectively during the AIDS stage of HIV infection, making AIDS patients very susceptible to most viruses, including HIV itself. This decline in killing of CD4^{+} T cells results in the virus being produced for a longer period (the infected CD4^{+} T cells are not killed as quickly), increasing the proliferation of the virus, and accelerating the development of the disease.
2. Antibody class switching declines significantly once helper T cell function fails. The immune system loses its ability to improve the affinity of their antibodies, and are unable to generate B cells that can produce antibody groups such as IgG and IgA. These effects are primarily due to the loss of any helper T cell that can interact with the B lymphocyte correctly. Another symptom of AIDS is the reduction in antibody levels due to a decrease in T_{h}2 cytokines (and less interactions by helper T cells). All of these complications result in an increased susceptibility to aggressive bacterial infections, especially in areas of the body not accessible by IgM antibodies.

If the patient does not respond to (or does not receive) HIV treatment they will succumb usually to either cancers or infections; the immune system finally reaches a point where it is no longer coordinated or stimulated enough to deal with the disease.

Inhibition of CD4 T-cell expansion during HIV infection may occur due to microbial translocation in an IL-10-dependent way. Triggering PD-1 expressed on activated monocytes by its ligand PD-L1, induces IL-10 production which inhibits CD4 T-cell function.

=== COVID-19 ===
In coronavirus disease 2019 (COVID-19) B cell, natural killer cell, and total lymphocyte counts decline, but both CD4^{+} and CD8^{+} cells decline to a far greater extent. Indicating that SARS-Cov-2 attacks the CD4^{+} cells during infection. Low CD4^{+} predicted greater likelihood of intensive care unit admission, and CD4^{+} cell count was the only parameter that predicted length of time for viral RNA clearance. Despite the reduced levels of CD4^{+}, COVID-19 patients with severe disease had higher levels of T_{h}1 CD4^{+} cells than patients with moderate disease.

== See also ==
- CD4^{+}/CD8^{+} ratio
- CD4^{+} T cells and antitumor immunity
- CD8^{+} T cells
- Cancer vaccine targeting CD4^{+} T cells
- List of distinct cell types in the adult human body
