= Clonal deletion =

Removal of autoreactive B and T cells before they become immunocompetent

In immunology, clonal deletion is the process of removing T and B lymphocytes from the immune system repertoire. The process of clonal deletion helps prevent recognition and destruction of the self host cells, making it a type of negative selection. Ultimately, clonal deletion plays a role in central tolerance. Clonal deletion can help protect individuals against autoimmunity, which is when an organism produces an immune response on its own cells. It is one of many methods used by the body in immune tolerance.

== Discovery ==
Central tolerance and clonal deletion did not get much attention in the early years of immunology. Frank Macfarlane Burnet was the first to suggest the idea of clonal deletion. A couple key findings helped Burnet's in this discovery. In 1936, Erich Traub demonstrated that when a developing mouse in the uterus is infected with a virus, once it is born it will elicit no antibody response to that same virus. Whereas a mouse that develops normally with no viral introduction during development, will develop an immune response to the same virus when infected after birth. Then in 1945, Ray David Owen observed that non-identical cattle twins were unable to reject blood from one another when the cattle had different blood types. The combination of Traub's evidence and Owens' observations helped Burnet and his partner, Frank Fenner, to propose that 'self' markers for host cells were determined at an embryonic state. Burnet was then able to hypothesize, in 1959, the clonal selection hypothesis. In part of this hypothesis, Burnet stated that an auto-reactive lymphocyte would be terminated before maturation in order to prevent further proliferation. Burnet, and others, would then go on to win the Nobel Prize in 1960 for their contributions to immunological tolerance. Now, clonal deletion has been a broadly discussed topic in immunology and transplantation for the past decades.

== Function ==
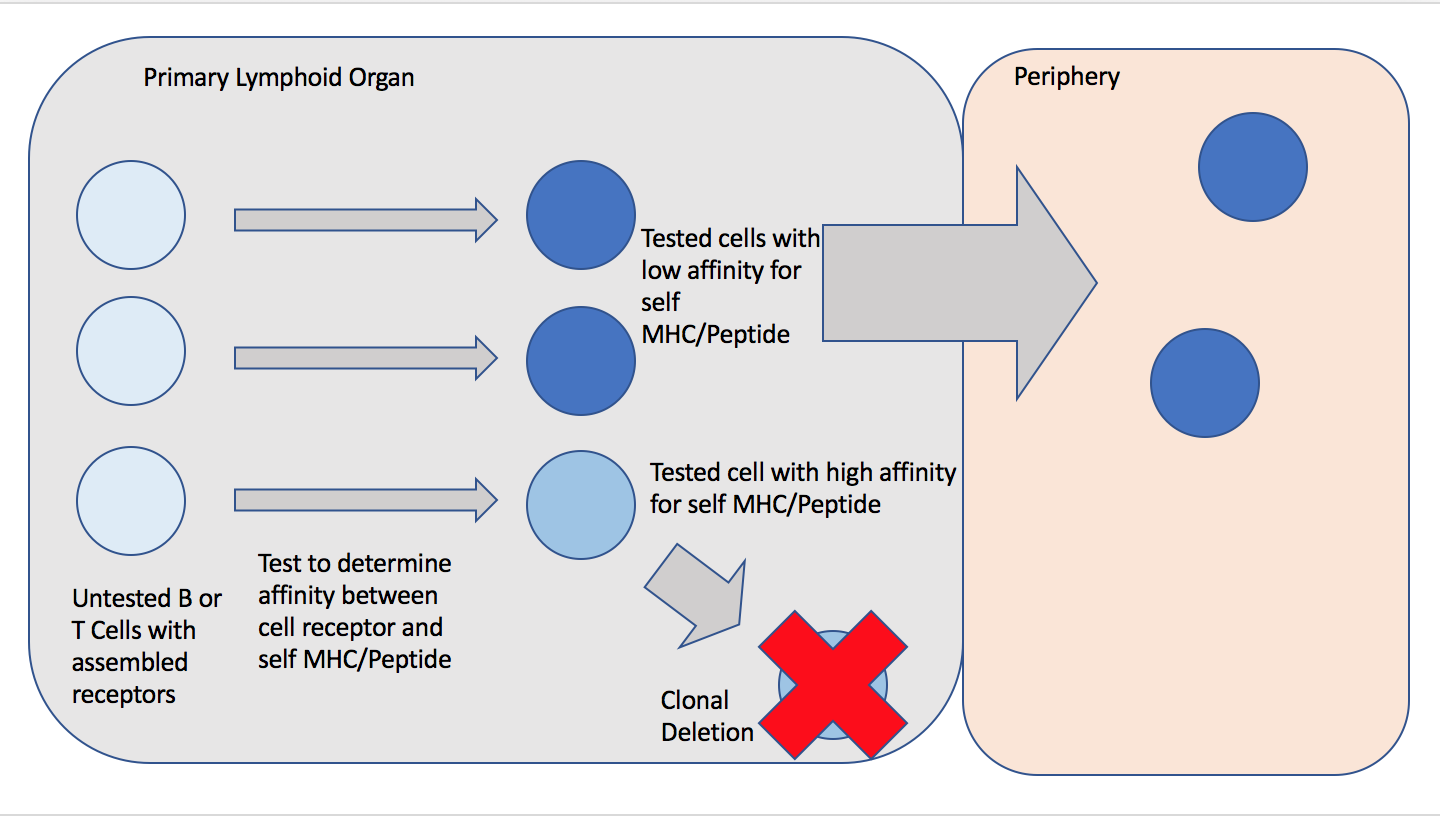
A visual representation of the process of clonal deletion in the primary lymphoid organs

There are millions of B and T lymphocytes within the immune system. As a T or B lymphocyte develops, they can rearrange their genome in order to express a unique antigen receptor that will recognize a specific epitope on a pathogen. There is a large diversity of epitopes recognized and, as a result, it is possible for some B and T lymphocytes to develop with the ability to recognize self. In order to prevent this from happening, every T and B lymphocyte that is generated is presented with a self antigen. If the antigen receptor present on the lymphocyte interacts with high affinity to the self antigen, then that lymphocyte is then categorized as 'self-reactive'. These 'self-reactive' lymphocytes will then undergo the process of clonal deletion. This is achieved through apoptosis of the respected cell, ultimately deleting the cell from the immune system. Not all lymphocytes expressing high affinity for self-antigen undergo clonal deletion. If autoreactive cells escape clonal deletion, there are mechanisms in the periphery involving T regulatory cells to prevent the host from obtaining an autoimmune disease. However, for both B and T cells in the primary lymphoid organs, clonal deletion is the most common form of negative selection. The process of clonal deletion helps protect the host from autoimmunity.

== Location and Mechanism ==
B and T lymphocytes are tested for self reactivity in the primary lymphoid organs, before entering into the periphery. The site at which this occurs is dependent on the type of lymphocyte. B lymphocytes both develop and mature within the bone marrow. Whereas T lymphocytes develop in the bone marrow and mature later in the thymus, hence the T. The mechanisms of central tolerance are not completely affective, and some autoreactive lymphocytes can find their way into circulation. However, the immune system has secondary defenses within the periphery to protect against this, referred to as peripheral tolerance.

=== B Lymphocytes ===
Regulation of auto-reactive B lymphocytes can occur at many different stages during B cell development. The first line of defense occurs within the bone marrow, before the auto-reactive cell can reach circulation. This occurs after the functional B-cell receptor (BCR) is assembled. If the BCR demonstrates a high affinity attraction to self-antigen then clonal deletion can occur at this point. However, some auto-reactive B lymphocytes can slip through this check point and find their way into circulation. If this occurs, then this is when peripheral tolerance come into effect. This is the process of removing auto-reactive cells within circulation after they have fully-matured. Examples of mechanisms used in peripheral tolerance against auto-reactive B lymphocytes include anergy, and antigen receptor desensitization. Like central tolerance, peripheral tolerance is not always fully accurate, leaving the possibility for an auto-reactive lymphocyte to remain in circulation.

=== T Lymphocytes ===
The process of removing auto-reactive T lymphocytes occurs in the thymus. The thymus contains two zones: the outer region called the thymic cortex, and the inner region called the thymic medulla. Within these regions T lymphocytes will undergo a series of positive or negative selection.

==== Thymic cortex ====
T lymphocytes first undergo positive selection within the thymic cortex. Here T lymphocytes are tested to see if they can recognize self major histocompatibility complex class I or II (MHC I/II). If the T lymphocyte can recognize self MHC I/II then it will continue maturation and move into the thymic medulla. If the T lymphocyte cannot recognize self (MHC I/II) then it will undergo neglect or apoptosis. Thymic dendritic cells and macrophages appear to be responsible for the apoptotic signals sent to autoreactive T cells in the thymic cortex.

==== Thymic medulla ====
T cells also have the opportunity to undergo clonal deletion within the thymic medulla. Here the T lymphocytes undergo negative selection. At this point they encounter MHC I/II complexes presenting self antigens. If the T lymphocyte interacts with high affinity to the complex presenting self antigen, then that lymphocyte will undergo apoptosis or Treg differentiation. Similarly to B lymphocyte regulation, T lymphocytes have the potential to leave the thymus and still be autoreactive. However, the immune system has evolved to combat this though peripheral tolerance. Mechanisms of peripheral tolerance against auto-reactive T lymphocytes include clonal arrest, clonal anergy, and clonal editing after.

== Complete vs. incomplete clonal deletion ==
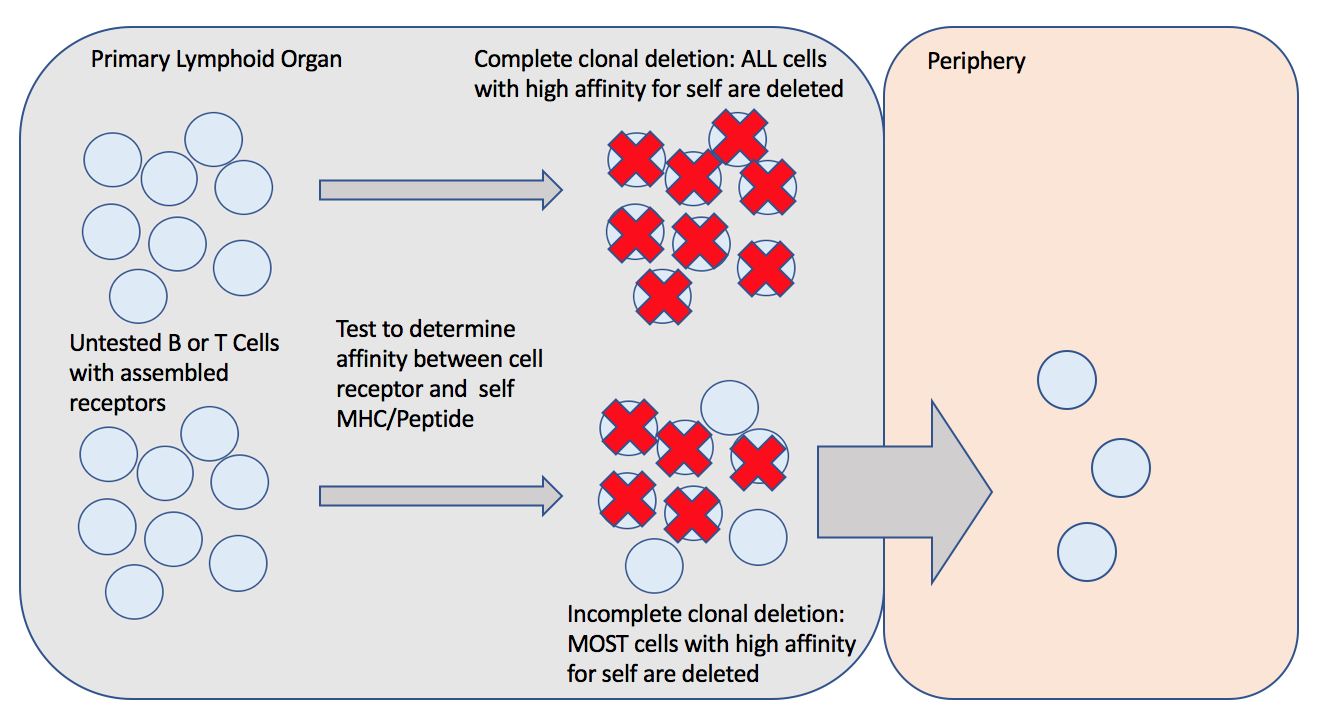
A visual representation of incomplete and complete clonal deletion

Complete clonal deletion results in apoptosis of all B and T lymphocytes expressing high affinity for self antigen. Incomplete clonal deletion results in apoptosis of most autoreactive B and T lymphocytes. Complete clonal deletion can lead to opportunities for molecular mimicry, which has adverse effects for the host. Therefore, incomplete clonal deletion allows for a balance between the host's ability to recognize foreign antigens and self antigens.

== Methods of exploitation ==
=== Molecular mimicry ===
Clonal deletion provides an incentive for microorganisms to develop epitopes similar to proteins found within the host. Because most autoresponsive cells undergo clonal deletion, this allows microorganisms with epitopes similar to host antigen to escape recognition and detection by T and B lymphocytes. However, if detected, this can lead to an autoimmune response because of the similarity of the epitopes on the microorganism and host antigen. Examples of this are seen in Streptococcus pyogenes and Borrelia burgdorferi. It is possible, but uncommon for molecular mimicry to lead to an autoimmune disease.

=== Superantigens ===
Superantigens are composed of viral or bacterial proteins and can hijack the clonal deletion process when expressed in the thymus because they resemble the T-cell receptor (TCR) interaction with self MHC/peptides. Thus, through this process, superantigens can effectively prevent maturation of cognate T cells.
