= Peripheral tolerance =

Removal of autoreactive T and B cells outside of the primary lymphoid organs

In immunology, peripheral tolerance is the second branch of immunological tolerance, after central tolerance. It takes place in lymph nodes and tissues other than the thymus and bone marrow (after T and B cells egress from primary lymphoid organs). Its main purpose is to ensure that self-reactive T and B cells which escaped central tolerance do not cause autoimmune disease. Peripheral tolerance can also serve a purpose in preventing an immune response to harmless food antigens and allergens. Mary E. Brunkow, Fred Ramsdell, and Shimon Sakaguchi were awarded the Nobel Prize in Physiology or Medicine in 2025 "for their discoveries concerning peripheral immune tolerance."

Self-reactive cells are subject to clonal deletion or clonal diversion. Both processes of peripheral tolerance control the presence and production of self-reactive immune cells. Deletion of self-reactive T cells in the thymus is only 60–70% efficient, and naive T cell repertoire contains a significant portion of low-avidity self-reactive T cells. These cells can trigger an autoimmune response, and there are several mechanisms of peripheral tolerance to prevent their activation. Antigen-specific mechanisms of peripheral tolerance include persistence of T cell in quiescence, ignorance of antigen and direct inactivation of effector T cells by either clonal deletion, conversion to regulatory T cells (Tregs) or induction of anergy. Tregs, which are also generated during thymic T cell development, further suppress the effector functions of conventional lymphocytes in the periphery. Dendritic cells (DCs) participate in the negative selection of autoreactive T cells in the thymus, but they also mediate peripheral immune tolerance through several mechanisms.

Dependence of a particular antigen on either central or peripheral tolerance is determined by its abundance in the organism. B cells have a lower probability that they will express cell surface markers to pose the threat of causing an autoimmune attack. What little is known about peripheral tolerance of B cells indicate that it is largely mediated by B cell dependence on T cell help. However, as B cells adjust their specificities in the germinal center, the self-reacting ones do tend to be selected against through unknown means.

== Cells mediating peripheral tolerance ==
=== Regulatory T cells ===
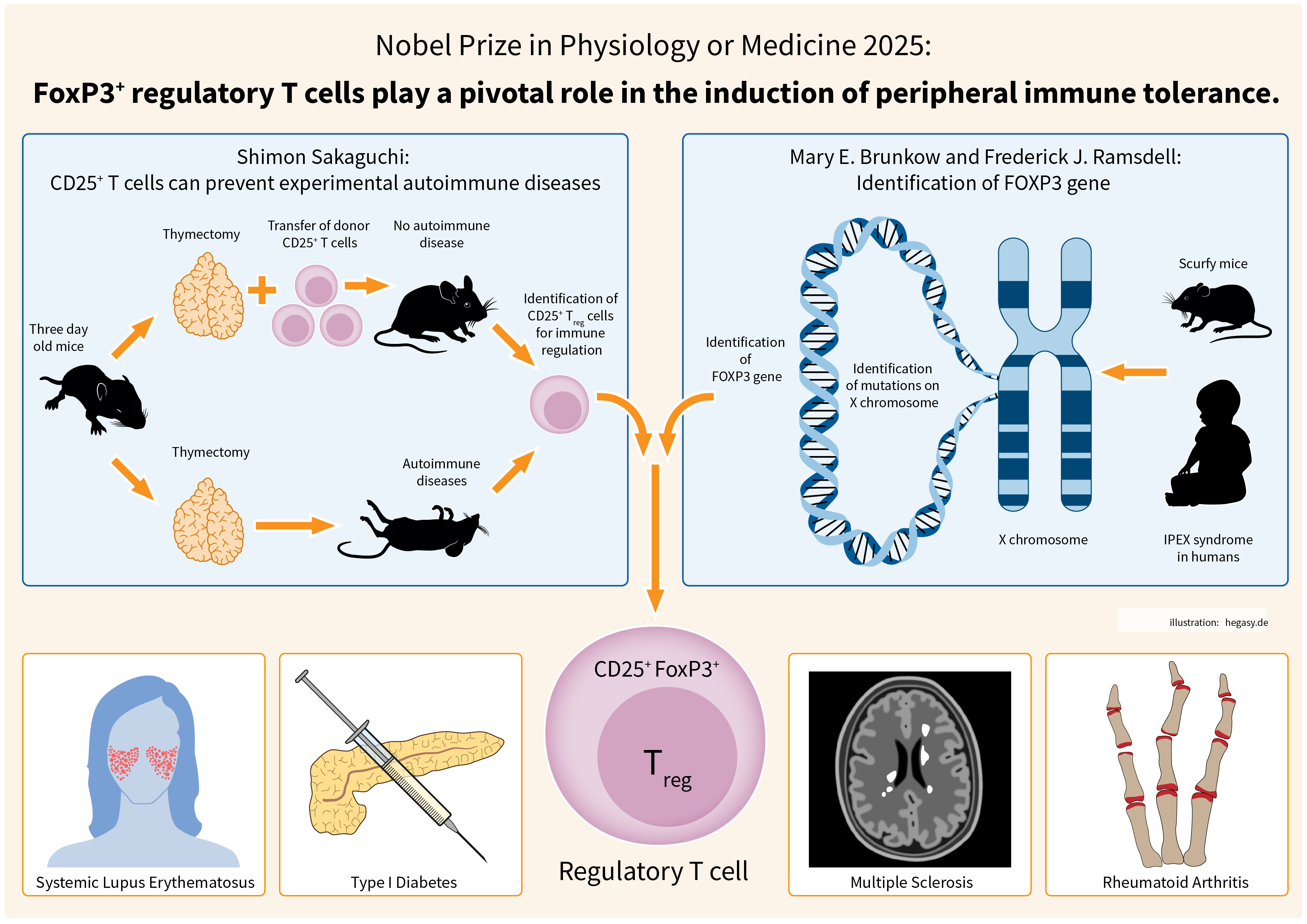
Nobel Prize in Physiology or Medicine 2025: FoxP3^{+} T_{reg} cells in peripheral immune tolerance.

Tregs are the central mediators of immune suppression, and they play a key role in maintaining peripheral tolerance. The master regulator of Treg phenotype and function is Foxp3. Natural Tregs (nTregs) are generated in the thymus during the negative selection. TCR of nTregs shows a high affinity for self-peptides. Induced Tregs (iTreg) develop from conventional naive helper T cells after antigen recognition in presence of TGF-β and IL-2. iTregs are enriched in the gut to establish tolerance to commensal microbiota and harmless food antigens. Regardless of their origin, once present, Tregs use several different mechanisms to suppress autoimmune reactions. These include depletion of IL-2 from the environment, secretion of anti-inflammatory cytokines IL-10, TGF-β and IL-35, and induction of apoptosis of effector cells. CTLA-4 is a surface molecule present on Tregs which can prevent CD28-mediated co-stimulation of T cells after TCR antigen recognition.

=== Tolerogenic DCs ===
Dendritic cells (DCs) are a major cell population responsible for the initiation of the adaptive immune response. They present short peptides on MHCII, which are recognized by specific TCR. After encountering an antigen with recognition danger- or pathogen-associated molecular patterns, DCs start the secretion of proinflammatory cytokines, express costimulatory molecules CD80 and CD86 and migrate to the lymph nodes to activate naive T cells. However, immature DCs (iDCs) are able to induce both CD4 and CD8 tolerance. The immunogenic potential of iDCs is weak, because of the low expression of costimulatory molecules and a modest level of MHCII. iDCs perform endocytosis and phagocytosis of foreign antigens and apoptotic cells, which occurs physiologically in peripheral tissues. Antigen-loaded iDCs migrate to the lymph nodes, secrete IL-10, TGF-β and present antigen to the naive T cells without co-stimulation. If the T cell recognizes the antigen, it is turned into the anergic state, depleted or converted to Treg. iDCs are more potent Treg inducers than lymph node–resident DCs. BTLA is a crucial molecule for DCs-mediated Treg conversion. Tolerogenic DCs express FasL and TRAIL to directly induce apoptosis of responding T cells. They also produce indoleamine 2,3-dioxygenase (IDO) to prevent T cell proliferation. Retinoic acid is secreted to support iTreg differentiation, too. Nonetheless, upon maturation (for example, during the infection), DCs largely lose their tolerogenic capabilities.

=== LNSCs ===
Aside from dendritic cells, additional cell populations were identified that are able to induce antigen-specific T cell tolerance. These are mainly the members of lymph node stromal cells (LNSCs). LNSCs are generally divided into several subpopulations based on the expression of gp38 (PDPN) and CD31 surface markers. Among those, only fibroblastic reticular cells and lymphatic endothelial cells (LECs) were shown to play a role in peripheral tolerance. Both of those populations are able to induce CD8 T cell tolerance by the presentation of the endogenous antigens on MHCI molecules. LNSCs lack expression of the autoimmune regulator, and the production of autoantigens depends on transcription factor Deaf1. LECs express PD-L1 to engage PD-1 on CD8 T cells to restrict self-reactivity. LNSCs can drive the CD4 T cell tolerance by the presentation of the peptide-MHCII complexes, which they acquired from the DCs. On the other hand, LECs can serve as a self-antigen reservoir and can transport self-antigens to DCs to direct self-peptide-MHCII presentation to CD4 T cells. In mesenteric lymph nodes (mLN), LNSCs can induce Tregs directly by secretion of TGF-β or indirectly by imprinting mLN–resident DCs.

== Intrinsic mechanisms of T cell peripheral tolerance ==
Although the majority of self-reactive T cell clones are deleted in the thymus by the mechanisms of central tolerance, low-affinity self-reactive T cells continuously escape to the immune periphery. Therefore, additional mechanisms exist to prevent self-reactive and unrestrained T cell responses.

=== Quiescence ===
When naive T cells exit the thymus, they are in a quiescent state. That means they are in the non-proliferative, G0 stage of the cell cycle and they have low metabolic, transcriptional and translational activities, but still retain the capacity to enter the cell cycle. Quiescence can prevent naive T cell activation after tonic signaling, meaning that T cells may be constitutively activated when not in the presence of a ligand. After antigen exposure and co-stimulation, naive T cells start the process called quiescence exit, which results in proliferation and effector differentiation.

Naive cells must enter and exit a quiescent state at the proper timing in their life cycle. If T cells exit a quiescence prematurely, there is a lack of tolerance to potential self-reactive cells. T cells rely on negative regulators to keep them in a quiescence state until they are ready for exit; the downregulation of negative regulators increases T cell activation. Premature and overactivation of T cells can lead to harmful downstream responses and possibly trigger an autoimmune response.

As cells exit a quiescent state, they will up regulate enzymes that are responsible for production of essential pathways (nucleic acids, proteins, carbohydrates, etc.). At this stage, the T cell will enter the cell cycle and continue to be metabolically active.

=== Ignorance ===
When self-reactive T cells escape thymic deletion, they may enter an ignorant state. Self-reactive T cells can fail to initiate immune response after recognition of self-antigen. These T cells are not classified as dysfunctional members of the immune response; rather, they are antigen-inexperienced naive cells that will remain in circulation. These cells retain the ability to become activated if in the presence of the correct stimuli.

Ignorance can be seen in situations where there is not a high enough concentration of antigen to trigger activation. The intrinsic mechanism of ignorance is when the affinity of TCR to antigen is too low to elicit T cell activation. There is also an extrinsic mechanism. Antigens, which are present in generally low numbers, cannot stimulate T cells sufficiently. Additionally, there are anatomical barriers that prohibit the activation of these T cells. These specialized mechanisms ensuring ignorance by the immune system have developed in so-called immune privileged organs.

T cells can overcome ignorance through a sufficient signal from signaling molecules (cytokines, infection, inflammatory stimuli, etc.) and induce an autoimmune response. In the inflammatory context, T cells can override ignorance and induce autoimmune disease.

=== Anergy ===
Anergy is a state of functional unresponsiveness induced upon self-antigen recognition. T cells can be made nonresponsive to antigens presented if the T cell engages an MHC molecule on an antigen presenting cell (signal 1) without engagement of costimulatory molecules (signal 2). Co-stimulatory molecules are upregulated by cytokines (signal 3) in the context of acute inflammation. Without pro-inflammatory cytokines, co-stimulatory molecules will not be expressed on the surface of the antigen presenting cell, and so anergy will result if there is an MHC-TCR interaction between the T cell and the APC. TCR stimulation leads to translocation of NFAT into the nucleus. In the absence of co-stimulation, there is no MAPK signaling in T cells and translocation of transcription factor AP-1 into the nucleus is impaired. This disbalance of transcription factors in T cells results in the expression of several genes involved in forming an anergic state. Anergic T cells show long-lasting epigenetic programming that silences effector cytokine production. Anergy is reversible and T cells can recover their functional responsiveness in the absence of the antigen.

=== Peripheral deletion ===
Before release into the periphery, T cells are subjected to thymic deletion if they prove to have the capacity to react with self. Peripheral deletion is the disposal of potential self-reactive T cells that escaped thymic deletion.

After T cell response to co-stimulation–deficient antigen, a minor population of T cells develop anergy and a large proportion of T cells are rapidly lost by apoptosis. This cell death can be mediated by intrinsic pro-apoptotic family member BIM. The balance between proapoptotic BIM and the antiapoptotic mediator BCL-2 determine the eventual fate of the tolerized T cell. There are also extrinsic mechanisms of deletion mediated by the cytotoxic activity of Fas/FasL or TRAIL/TRAILR interaction. Cell death can be mediated by intrinsic of extrinsic methods as mentioned. In most instances, there is an upregulation of death markers or the presence of Bcl-2 proteins, which are essential proteins in facilitating programmed cell death.

== Immunoprivileged organs ==
Immunoprivileged organs evolved mechanisms in which specialized tissue cells and immune cells can mount an appropriate response without disturbing the specialized tissue. Immunopathogenic disturbances are not present in a variety of specialized organs such as the eyes, reproductive organs, and the central nervous system. These areas are protected by several mechanisms: Fas-ligand expression binds, Fas on lymphocytes inducing apoptosis, anti-inflammatory cytokines (including TGF-beta and interleukin 10) and blood-tissue barrier with tight junctions between endothelial cells.

== Split tolerance ==
Split tolerance describes how some antigens can trigger an immune response in one aspect of the immune system and the same antigen could not trigger a response in another set of immune cells. Since many pathways of immunity are interdependent, they do not all need to be tolerized. For example, tolerized T cells will not activate auto-reactive B cells. Without this help from CD4 T cells, the B cells will not be activated.
