= Clonal anergy =

Lack of response by the immune system to foreign substances

In immunology, anergy is a lack of reaction by the body's defense mechanisms to foreign substances, and consists of a direct induction of peripheral lymphocyte tolerance. An individual in a state of anergy often indicates that the immune system is unable to mount a normal immune response against a specific antigen, usually a self-antigen. Lymphocytes are said to be anergic when they fail to respond to their specific antigen. Anergy is one of three processes that induce tolerance, modifying the immune system to prevent self-destruction (the others being clonal deletion and immunoregulation).

== Mechanism ==
This phenomenon was first described in B lymphocytes by Gustav Nossal and termed "clonal anergy." The clones of B lymphocytes in this case can still be found alive in the circulation, but are ineffective at mounting immune responses. Later Ronald Schwartz and Marc Jenkins described a similar process operating in the T lymphocyte. Many viruses (HIV being the most extreme example) seem to exploit the immune system's use of tolerance induction to evade the immune system, though the suppression of specific antigens is done by fewer pathogens (notably Mycobacterium leprae).

At the cellular level, "anergy" is the inability of an immune cell to mount a complete response against its target. In the immune system, circulating cells called lymphocytes form a primary army that defends the body against pathogenic viruses, bacteria and parasites. There are two major kinds of lymphocytes – the T lymphocyte and the B lymphocyte. Among the millions of lymphocytes in the human body, only a few actually are specific for any particular infectious agent. At the time of infection, these few cells must be recruited and allowed to multiply rapidly. This process – called "clonal expansion" – allows the body to quickly mobilise an army of clones, as and when required. Such immune response is anticipatory and its specificity is assured by pre-existing clones of lymphocytes, which expand in response to specific antigen (process called "clonal selection"). This specific clonal army then combats the pathogen until the body is free of the infection. Following clearance of the infection, the clones that are no longer needed die away naturally.

However, a small number of the body's army of lymphocytes are able to react with proteins that are normally present in a healthy body. The clonal expansion of those cells can lead to autoimmune diseases, wherein the body attacks itself. In order to prevent this process, lymphocytes possess an intrinsic quality-control mechanism. This machinery shuts down the lymphocytes' ability to expand, if the trigger for the expansion turns out to be the body's own protein. T-cell anergy can arise when the T-cell does not receive appropriate co-stimulation in the presence of specific antigen recognition. B-cell anergy can be induced by exposure to soluble circulating antigen, and is often marked by a downregulation of surface IgM expression and partial blockade of intracellular signaling pathways.

== Molecular mechanism of anergy induction in T lymphocytes ==
Stimulation of the T cell receptor (TCR) along with costimulatory receptors of a T lymphocyte triggers balanced activation of all the T-cell’s signalling pathways (full T-cell stimulation). In this case, beside other pathways, calcium dependent arm of a lymphocyte signalling is activated by TCR. This leads to an elevation of intracellular Ca^{+II} concentration. Under this condition, calcium dependent phosphatase calcineurin removes phosphates from a transcriptional factor NFAT, which in turn translocates to the nucleus.

Additionally, during full T-cell stimulation a costimulatory receptor CD28 activates PI3K or other pathways that eventually lead to increased nuclear levels of rel, NF-κB and AP-1 (transcription factors) much more than just by the TCR activation alone. AP-1, fos/jun heterodimer, further heterodimerizes with NFAT forming a transcriptional complex which promotes transcription of T-cell productive response associated genes. Those are for example IL-2 and its receptor.

On the contrary, TCR signalling without costimulatory receptors sufficiently activates only the calcium arm of the signalling leading only to the activation of NFAT. However without the necessary induction of AP-1 by other pathways, activated NFAT is unable to form the transcriptional complex with AP-1, as it does during complete T-cell activation (productive response). In this case NFAT homodimerizes (complexes with itself), working as a transcriptional factor that induces anergy in the lymphocyte instead.

NFAT homodimers are directly responsible for the expression of anergy associated genes such as ubiquitin ligase GRAIL or a protease caspase 3. Moreover, the expression levels of IL-2, but also for example TNFα and IFNγ, typical for productive response, are actively decreased in the anergized cell. Anergized cells tend to produce antiinflammatory IL-10 instead. There are 3 NFAT proteins in the T-cell, NFAT1, NFAT2 and NFAT4 and apparently are redundant to some extent.

Thus when an antigen is properly presented to the T lymphocytes by an antigen presenting cell (APC), which displays the antigen on its MHC II complex and which activates T cell´s costimulatory receptors, T lymphocytes undergo productive response. However, when T cells interacts with an antigen not presented by the APCs, that is very probably not the antigen that an immune response should be held against, the T cell undergoes anergy. It has also been shown that certain antigens properly presented by the APCs induce the T cell activation only weakly. This weak stimuli still activates NFAT sufficiently, however AP-1 is not, thereby the anergistic response takes place even with the costimulation. Strong stimulation of T-cells either by IL-2 or by TCR/costimulatory receptors can break the anergy.

== Clinical significance ==
Anergy may be taken advantage of for therapeutic uses. The immune response to grafting of transplanted organs and tissues could be minimized without weakening the entire immune system— a side effect of immunosuppressive drugs like cyclosporine. Anergy may also be used to induce activated lymphocytes to become unresponsive with autoimmune diseases like diabetes mellitus, multiple sclerosis and rheumatoid arthritis. Likewise, preventing anergy in response to a tumoral growth may help in anti-tumor responses. It might also be used for immunotherapeutic treatment of allergies.

== Dominant tolerance ==
Dominant and recessive tolerance are forms of a peripheral tolerance (the other tolerance beside peripheral is a central tolerance). Where so called recessive tolerance is associated with anergized lymphocytes as described above, in the dominant form of tolerance, specialized T-reg cells which actively ablate the immune response are developed from the naive T lymphocyte. Similarly to recessive tolerance, unopposed NFAT signalling is also important for T-reg induction. In this case, the NFAT pathway activates another transcription factor – FOXP3 that is a marker of T-regs and participates in their genetic program.

== Testing ==
The "Multitest Mérieux" or "CMI Multitest" system (Multitest IMC, Istituto Merieux Italia, Rome, Italy) has been used as a general test of the level of cellular immunity. It is an intradermal test of skin reactivity (similar to tuberculin tests) in which a control (glycerol) is used with seven antigens of bacterial or fungal origin (tetanus toxoid, tuberculin, diphtheria, streptococcus, candida, trichophyton, and proteus). In this test reactions are categorized according to the number of antigens provoking a response and the summed extent of the skin response to all seven antigens. Here anergy is defined as a region of skin reactivity of 0–1 mm, hypoergy as a reaction of 2–9 mm in response to fewer than three antigens, normergic as a reaction of 10–39 mm or to three or more antigens, and hyperergy for a reaction of 40 mm or more.

== Experimental approaches to study anergy ==
Various chemicals inducing/inhibiting described T cell signalling pathways can be used to study the anergy. The anergy in T cells can be induced by Ionomycin, the ionophore capable of raising intracellular concentration of calcium ions artificially.

Conversely, Ca^{+II} chelators such as EGTA can sequester calcium ions making them unable to cause the anergy. Blocking of the pathway leading to the anergy can be also done by cyclosporin A, which is capable of inhibiting calcineurin – the phosphatase responsible for dephosphorylating of NFAT priming its activation.

PMA, phorbol 12-myristate 13-acetate, along with ionomycin is used to induce full T cells activation by mimicking signals provided naturally by TCR/costimulatory receptors activation.
