= T-cell acute lymphoblastic leukemia =

Type of acute lymphoblastic leukemia

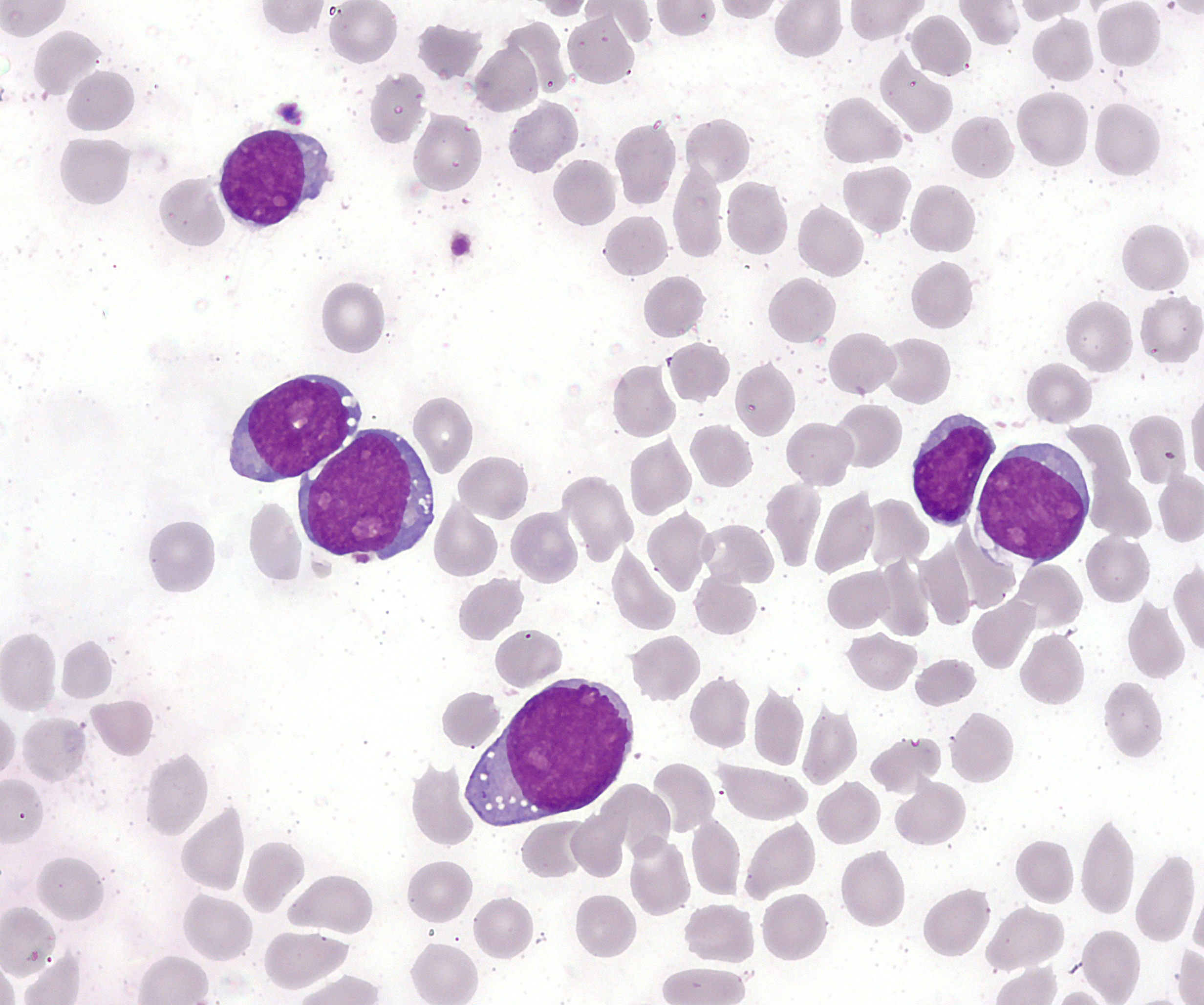
- T-lymphoblastic cells of acute leukemia in the bone marrow. In some cases, the cytoplasm is concentrated at one pole of the cell, forming "hand mirror cells".
- Specialty: Haematology, oncology
- Symptoms: Recurrent infections, unusual or common bleeding and bruising, extreme tiredness, unexplained fever, unexplained weight gain, swollen lymph nodes
- Usual onset: Most prevalent in the adult population with incidence diminishing with age. Amongst pediatric population, median onset of age 9. Marked male predominance
- Causes: Currently unknown
- Diagnostic method: Blood test, bone marrow aspiration, biopsy, CT, MRI, lumbar puncture, genetic testing
- Treatment: Long-term chemotherapy, CNS radiation therapy, stem cell transplantation
- Prognosis: 5-Year Event Free Survival: 70%, Overall Survival: 80%
- Frequency: 7% at ages 1-10, 14% at ages 10-15, and 29% at ages 15-18

T-cell acute lymphoblastic leukemia (T-ALL) is a type of acute lymphoblastic leukemia characterized by an aggressive malignant neoplasm of the bone marrow. Acute lymphoblastic leukemia (ALL) is a condition wherein immature white blood cells accumulate in the bone marrow and crowd out normal white blood cells. Accumulation in the liver, spleen, and lymph nodes frequently occurs as well.

The two most common cells involved in ALL are B-lymphocytes and T-lymphocytes. B-lymphocytes protect the body against viruses and bacteria through antibody production, whereas T-lymphocytes destroy bacteria or cells infected with viruses. Approximately 20% of ALL patients suffer from T-ALL, which is more prevalent in the adult population compared to children, with incidence rates diminishing as the age of the patient increases.

Among T-ALL cases in the pediatric population, the median onset is age 9, and the disease is particularly prominent among adolescents. The disease arises when certain cytogenetic and molecular abnormalities result in the disruption of developmental pathways that control thymocyte development, tumour suppressor development, and alterations in the control of cell growth and proliferation become dysregulated.

Distinct from adult T-cell leukemia (in which T-cell lymphotropic virus Type I causes malignant maturation of T-cells), T-ALL is a precursor for lymphoid neoplasm. Its clinical presentation most commonly includes infiltration of the central nervous system (CNS, i.e. brain and spinal cord), and is often associated with a mediastinal mass that originates from the thymus, as well as extramedullary involvement of multiple organs (particularly lymph nodes) as a result of hyperleukocytosis.

== Signs and symptoms ==
Patients with T-ALL may not always exhibit all the signs and symptoms listed below. Individuals with other medical conditions that are not leukemia may also experience similar symptoms (see the section on Diagnosis below).

- Recurrent infections due to a lack of normal white blood cells (i.e. Neutrophils)
- Unusual and/or uncommon bleeding and bruising
- Extreme tiredness and swelling of the lymph nodes in the neck or middle of the chest, potentially causing facial swelling, or generalized lymphadenopathy
- Unexplained fevers, chills, and/or night sweats
- Unexplained weight loss and/or loss of appetite
- Unexplained skin itching

=== Clinical manifestations ===
Originating from epigenetic and genetic alterations in immature thymocytes, T-ALL is a highly aggressive and heterogenous disease. Patients often present with extensive bone marrow involvement, mediastinal mass, adenopathy, CNS involvement, and splenomegaly. The symptoms can appear acutely or develop progressively over time. The most common clinical feature among patients is the proliferation of malignant clones, suppressing normal haematopoiesis and resulting in a deficiency of functioning peripheral blood cells, particularly thrombocytes.

== Risk factors ==
T-ALL is neither contagious nor inherited. Its two main risk factors are age and sex. While cases of most other leukemias increase with age, T-ALL is an exception, peaking in children aged 2 to 5 years. T-ALL is most prevalent in the adult population, but among paediatric cases, it has a median onset at age 9 and is most prominent in adolescents. The disease also exhibits a marked male predominance, with males having a three-fold increased risk of developing T-ALL compared to females. The reasons for T-ALL's higher incidence rates in older children and males are currently unclear.

== Cytogenetics ==
Basic karyotyping has shown structural chromosomal rearrangements in 50-75% of T-ALL patients, primarily involving inversions and translocations. Diagnostic yield can be substantially increased through other methods such as fluorescent in situ hybridization (FISH) and various molecular technologies, for example, single nucleotide polymorphism (SNP) arrays. The most common structural abnormality is the rearrangement of the T-cell receptor (TCR) gene. 95% of T-cell TCRs consist of an alpha and beta chain (encoded by TRA and TRB, respectively), while only 5% consist of gamma and delta chains (encoded by TRG and TRD, respectively).

Karyotyping has shown that TRD and TRB undergo recombination most commonly, whereas TRA is seldom involved, and TRG is rarely rearranged. These rearrangements affect the normal process of TCR formation and can lead to the failure of cellular machinery to correctly repair recombination-activating gene (RAG) protein-induced double-strand breaks. All 30 genes known to illegitimately recombine with TCR genes primarily function to regulate epigenetics through roles such as signal transducers, transcription factors (tumour suppressors or oncogenes), cell cycle regulators, or ribosomal proteins.

In T-ALL patients, TCRs encoded by TRA, TRD, and TRG at chromosome bands 14q11 and 7q34 become malignant. The build-up of malignant T-cells in T-ALL consists of clones with identical TCR gene arrangements originating from a single cell. The gene rearrangements resulting from the malignant cell juxtapose both TCR genes and other critical genes that code for transcription factors. This leads to the dysregulation of partner gene transcription, serving as the main cause of leukemogenesis – a multi-step process of induction, development, and progression of leukemic diseases. Approximately 20% of all leukemias demonstrate simultaneous rearrangement of these genes.

== Pathology ==
Like most cancers, mutations in DNA lead to the development of T-cell acute lymphoblastic leukemia (T-ALL) and loss of function in white blood cells. Different subtypes of leukemia share similarities in their causes, which include a combination of genetics, epigenetic changes, and environmental factors. However, because there are fewer cases of T-ALL compared to other subtypes of leukemia, the exact cause(s) (i.e. etiology) of T-ALL remains unclear. T-ALL is neither contagious nor inherited, but specific genetic mutations (commonly including those in NOTCH1 and CDKN2A) may be passed along, increasing susceptibility to cases of T-ALL.

=== Causes of T-ALL ===
==== Genetic conditions ====
Some patients may have familial histories with leukemia predispositions, increasing the risk of developing T-ALL. Li–Fraumeni syndrome is an inherited condition that leads to mutations in TP53, a tumour suppressor gene, thereby increasing the risk of T-ALL. Mutations in the SPRED1 gene are also associated with the development of T-ALL.

Patients with immature thymocytes in the thymus may develop T-ALL, and certain hereditary conditions (such as Trisomy 21, or Down syndrome, as well as neurofibromatosis type 1, ataxia telangiectasia, and Noonan syndrome) are associated with a higher risk of developing T-ALL.

==== Radiation exposure ====
Human T-Lymphotropic Virus (Type 1)

Individuals who have had previous chemotherapy or radiation exposure may have an increased risk of developing T-ALL. Certain inherited polymorphic variants of CDKN2A are associated with the development of T-ALL. Emission of strontium^{90} (SR-90) from nuclear reactor accidents is also believed to increase theoretical risk of developing T-ALL. It is also theorized that intensely radioactive nuclear fallout containing strontium^{90}, created by the detonation of nuclear weapons with added cobalt, would cause large numbers of deaths via radiation induced cancers of bone, thyroid, and T-ALL (see cobalt bomb).

==== Chemical exposure ====
Benzene, a chemical classified as carcinogenic to humans, is associated with an increased risk of T-ALL and other forms of leukemia.

==== Viruses ====
Human T-lymphotropic virus (HTLV-1) is a retroviral infection that affects white blood cells (T cells), which may later develop into T-ALL and other subtypes of leukemia.

== Diagnosis ==
When doctors suspect a patient may be suffering from a T-cell acute lymphoblastic leukemia (T-ALL) after a careful examination of their medical history, signs, and symptoms, they will conduct various tests, procedures, and scans to diagnose T-ALL. Some symptoms and aspects of medical history may not be specific enough to diagnose T-ALL, so further testing may be required. Doctors may consider several factors but will not necessarily conduct all possible tests.

=== Assessments ===
==== Blood tests ====
A Complete blood count (CBC) is performed to test for T-ALL by measuring the different types and maturity of cells in the patient's blood, allowing the doctor to determine whether leukemic cells are present. Additionally, blood tests showing high levels of white blood cells or low levels of red blood cells may also indicate T-ALL. Further testing could also help determine whether T-ALL has affected other organs, such as the kidneys, and identify the genetic alterations associated with the disease.

==== Bone marrow aspiration and biopsy ====
Bone marrow consists of a combination of solid and liquid components. Bone marrow aspiration and biopsies are typically done simultaneously to help determine and confirm the type and severity of T-ALL. Additional biopsies, such as skin and lymph node biopsies, may also be needed to check for the spread of T-ALL.

==== X-rays and ultrasound ====
Since a swollen spleen and lymph nodes are symptoms of T-ALL, X-rays and ultrasound scans, such as CT and MRI, can help confirm the diagnosis. These scans also provide information on the impact of T-ALL on other organs of the body.

==== Lumbar puncture ====
To ensure effective treatments for T-cells that have invaded the central nervous system (CNS), a lumbar puncture allows doctors to determine whether the treatments are effective (or more likely to be effective). This procedure also reveals the spread (metastasis) of T-ALL.

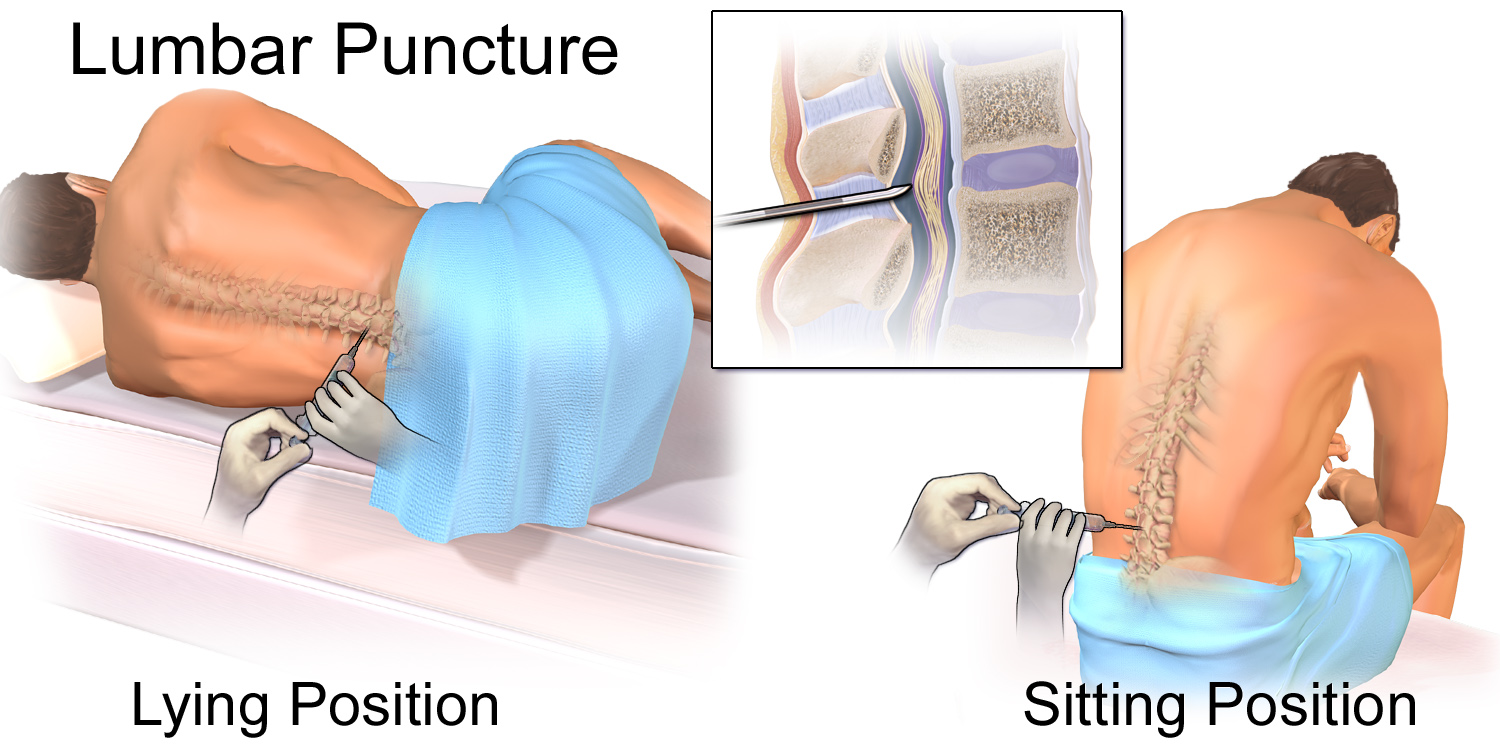
Lumbar Puncture Positions

==== Genetic test ====
Genetic testing helps identify chromosomal abnormalities in patients. This can help diagnose the specific leukemia subtype by identifying genetic mutations helpful in classification and stratification.

=== Staging ===
Normal staging is not used for T-ALL because it has already spread throughout the body at the time of diagnosis. However, T-ALL has its own system of classification. First, patterns of gene expression are investigated to define T-ALL. Then, stages of thymic development are determined by identifying specific expressions in chromosomal abnormalities. This classification system identifies T-ALL cases as being either high or low risk. Patients then receive appropriate treatment based on their classification.

== Treatment ==
Currently, standard treatment for T-cell acute lymphoblastic leukemia (T-ALL) involves long-term chemotherapy and medication to prevent or treat side effects associated with low white blood cell counts resulting from intensive chemotherapy regimens. The treatment typically occurs in three stages: induction, consolidation, and maintenance. The entire treatment process usually spans approximately two years, with the maintenance phase lasting the longest.

Central Nervous System Involvement

T-ALL can spread to the brain and spinal cord, which can be diagnosed through lumbar puncture assessment. Lumbar puncture helps identify leukemic cells in the cerebrospinal fluid (CSF). Even if leukemic cells are not found in the CSF at the time of diagnosis, it is highly likely that they will spread there over time. Thus, prophylactic intrathecal chemotherapy, a treatment to lower the risk of leukemia spreading to the spinal cord and brain by directly administering chemotherapy to the CSF, is crucial.

Comparison with B-ALL

Compared to B-ALL, T-ALL patients present more high-risk features, including a tendency for earlier relapse, CNS involvement, and resistance to chemotherapy. In response, prophylactic intrathecal chemotherapy is further enhanced by CNS radiation therapy. For high-risk T-ALL patients, allogeneic hematopoietic stem cell transplantation has shown highly successful and promising results. However, it also increases the risk of relapse, which reduces its curative potential. Patients undergoing transplantation must be continuously monitored for minimal residual disease (MRD), usually via qPCR analysis of T-cell receptor (TCR) genes to evaluate for fusion transcripts such as SIL-TAL1. Mutation of TAL1 is frequently present in T-ALL patients, where SIL/TAL1 fusion leads to inappropriate TAL1 expression, promoting leukemogenesis. Early intervention during the early stages of relapse is critical.

Multimodal Therapy for Young Patients

Young T-ALL patients have shown significant improvement through multimodal therapy. This involves initial induction therapy, including a glucocorticoid, vincristine, L-asparaginase, and an anthracycline for 4 to 6 weeks, followed by intensive combination therapy for 6–8 months, and finally 18–30 months of low-intensity anti-metabolite-based therapy. It is crucial to differentiate treatment approaches between youth and adults. Studies have shown that administering either a traditional paediatric regimen or intensive block-based chemotherapy yields significantly different responses. While both treatments include high-dose methotrexate, asparaginase and allogeneic hematopoietic stem cell transplantation, high survival and low death rates were observed in patients receiving the first treatment. In contrast, the latter approach resulted in a high toxic death rate among adults.

== Prognosis ==
In childhood, T-cell acute lymphoblastic leukemia (T-ALL) patients can expect a 5-year event-free survival (EFS) rate of 70% and an overall survival (OS) rate of 80%. Among the approximately 25% of children who relapse, survival rates drop to 30-50%, with patients generally showing a much poorer prognosis. Monitoring for minimal residual disease (MRD) via qPCR analysis is critical, as mentioned previously, to evaluate the efficacy of treatment.

Recent genomic studies have identified a selection of genetic variants related to clonal evolution that drive resistance, which serve as the basis for T-ALL relapse. Over 20% of patients with relapsed T-ALL show mutations in the cytosolic 5’-nucleotidase II (NT5C2) gene, while the TFDP3 gene has also been found to confer chemoresistance in children.

== Epidemiology ==
NOTCH1 and CDKN2A are typically the most common mutations in T-ALL patients, however over 100 gene mutations have been identified.

In over 50% of paediatric T-ALL cases, mutations in epigenetic regulation have been identified. These mutations activate NOTCH1 and FBXW7, causing the tumour-suppressing gene to lose functionality, thereby leading to genesis of T-ALL.

A near-telomeric location may sometimes generate subtle exchanges in DNA at loci involved in oncogenic rearrangements of T-ALL. This causes cryptic translocation, thereby deleting the putative tumour suppressor gene CDKN2A (INK4A). Simultaneously, TLX1 and NOTCH1 may also be activated at higher frequencies than usual. Thus, the multistep progenesis of T-ALL has been said to intensify and rapidly progress due to accumulation of effects resulting from dysregulation of multiple signalling pathways.
