= Non-catalytic tyrosine-phosphorylated receptor =

Group of cell surface receptors expressed by leukocytes

Non-catalytic tyrosine-phosphorylated receptors (NTRs), also called immunoreceptors or Src-family kinase-dependent receptors, are a group of cell surface receptors expressed by leukocytes that are important for cell migration and the recognition of abnormal cells or structures and the initiation of an immune response. These transmembrane receptors are not grouped into the NTR family based on sequence homology, but because they share a conserved signaling pathway utilizing the same signaling motifs. A signaling cascade is initiated when the receptors bind their respective ligand resulting in cell activation. For that tyrosine residues in the cytoplasmic tail of the receptors have to be phosphorylated, hence the receptors are referred to as tyrosine-phosphorylated receptors. They are called non-catalytic receptors, as the receptors have no intrinsic tyrosine kinase activity and cannot phosphorylate their own tyrosine residues. Phosphorylation is mediated by additionally recruited kinases. A prominent member of this receptor family is the T-cell receptor.

== Features and Classification ==
Members of the Non-catalytic tyrosine-phosphorylated receptor family share a couple of common features. The most prominent feature is the presence of conserved signaling motifs containing tyrosine residue, such as Immunoreceptor tyrosine-based activation motifs (ITAMs), in the cytoplasmic tail of the receptors. The receptor signaling pathway is initiated by ligand binding to the extracellular domains of the receptor. Upon binding, the tyrosine residues in the signaling motifs are phosphorylated by membrane-associated tyrosine kinases. The receptors themselves have no intrinsic tyrosine kinase activity. The phosphorylated NTRs, in turn, initiate a specific intracellular signaling cascades. The signaling cascade is down-regulated by dephosphorylation by protein tyrosine phosphatases. Additional characteristics of the receptor family are a rather small (< 20 nm) extracellular domain and the binding to ligands that are anchored to solid surfaces or membranes of other cells. NTRs are exclusively expressed in leukocytes.

Based on those features, about 100 distinct NTRs have been identified. The table below lists different classes of NTRs. Members of a class have a high sequence homology and typically share the same gene locus.

| Family | Ligands | Examples |
|---|---|---|
| Antigen receptors found on T cells and B cells (T-cell receptor and B-cell receptor) | MHC class I or II loaded with peptide for T-cell receptors, soluble or surface antigens for B-cell receptor | TCR BCR |
| C-type lectin domain family | Glycans, Actin, MHC class I | Dectin-1, NKG2, BDCA2 |
| CD300 family | Unknown | CD300A |
| Classical Fc receptor family | Fc region of antibody | FcγRI, FcγRII |
| Fc receptor-like family | Unknown | FCRL1 |
| KIR family | MHC class 1 | KIR2DL1, KIR3DL2, KIR2DS1 |
| LILR family | MHC class 1 | LILRB4 |
| Natural cytotoxicity triggering receptor (NCR) family | Viral hemagglutinins, heparan sulfate proteoglycans, activation-induced C-type lectin | NKp44, NKp46, NKp30 |
| Paired immunoglobulin-like receptor (PILR) family | PILR-associating neural protein (PANP), HSV-1 glycoprotein B | PILRA, PILRB |
| SIGLEC family | Endogenous and pathogen-derived sialylated glycans | SIGLEC1, SIGLEC8, SIGLEC7, SIGLEC2 |
| CD28 family | B7 family of membrane proteins | CD28, CTLA-4, ICOS, BTLA |
| CD200R family | CD200 | CD200R1, CD5, CD6 |
| Signal-regulatory protein (SIRP) family | CD47, surfactant proteins e.g. SPA1 | SIRPα |
| Signaling lymphocytic activation molecule (SLAM) family | Homophilic (bind SLAM family members), CD48 | SLAMF1, SLAMF3 |
| Collagen receptors | Collagen | LAIR1 OSCAR GPVI |

== Structure ==
NTRs are transmembrane glycoproteins with typically small ectodomains of 6 to 10 nm. NTRs have either an N-terminal or C terminal ectodomains. Ectodomains have a high sequence diversity between members. Many NTRs have an unstructured intracellular domain which contains tyrosine residues that can be phosphorylated by tyrosine kinases. Some receptors in this family, however, lack a cytoplasmic tail and therefore associate with adaptor proteins containing the same tyrosine residues. Adaptor proteins associate to their respective NTR through their transmembrane helixes carrying oppositely charged residues. The cytoplasmic domains do not contain any intrinsic tyrosine kinase activity.

=== Conserved tyrosine-containing motifs ===
Tyrosine residues of NTRs mostly appear in conserved amino acid motifs with defined sequence signatures that define whether the receptor plays an activator or inhibiting role in the cell. These motifs allow binding of proteins containing a SH2 domain. Motifs are intrinsic or in the associated adaptor subunits. Immunoreceptor tyrosine-based activation motifs (ITAMs) are short amino acid sequences that contain two tyrosine residues (Y) arranged as Yxx(L/I)x6-8Yxx(L/I), where L and I indicate Leucine or Isoleucine residue respectively (according to amino acid abbreviations), x denotes any amino acids, a subscribe 6-8 indicates a sequence of 6 to 8 amino acids in length. ITAMs recruits activating kinases to the NTR. Inhibitory signals are transduced by Immunoreceptor tyrosine-based inhibitory motifs (ITIMs) of the signature (S/I/V/L)xYxx(I/V/L), bind to cytoplasmic tyrosine phosphatases. Immunoreceptor Tyrosine-based Switch Motifs (ITSMs) with the signature TxYxx(I/V) may induce both activator and inhibitory signals. These motifs are confined to SLAM family receptors. Finally, Immunoglobulin Tail Tyrosine Motifs (ITTMs) with a YxNM signature have been found to have a costimulatory effect.

== Signalling Pathway ==
=== Biophysics of receptor-ligand binding ===
The signalling pathway of an NTR is induced upon binding to its respective ligand. NTRs, as they are defined, have a short ectodomain (5 - 10 nm) and bind to surface-anchored ligands. For binding to take place, the membrane of the leukocyte has to come into close proximity to the surface with the ligand. The receptor-ligand complex, once bound, spans a dimension of about 10-16 nm. Ectodomains of other surface molecules can be much larger (up to 50 nm), therefore the membrane has to bend towards the ligand, which introduces tension within the membrane. Additionally, large pulling forces can act on the complex, changing dissociation rates of the complex.

=== Receptor triggering ===
NTR triggering, the initial step of the NTR signalling pathway, involves phosphorylation of the tyrosine residues in the cytoplasmic domain of the receptor or the associated adaptor protein. Once phosphorylated, these residues recruit further signalling proteins. Phosphorylation of the tyrosine residues is performed by membrane-anchored Src family kinases (SFK) (e.g. Lck, Fyn, Lyn, Blk), while receptor protein tyrosine phosphatases (RPTP) (e.g. CD45, CD148) mediate the dephosphorylation of the same residues. SFK and RPTP are constitutively active. In an untriggered state, the activity of phosphatases dominates, keeping NTRs in an unphosphorylated state, and thus preventing signal initiation. It has been shown that inhibition of tyrosine phosphatases induces phosphorylation in NTRs and signalling even without ligand binding. It is therefore assumed that a perturbation of SFK and RPTP balance due to ligand binding, leading to stronger kinase activity and hence accumulation of phosphorylated tyrosine residues, is needed for initiation of downstream signalling.

Different mechanisms of how the balance is disturbed upon ligand binding have been suggested. The induced proximity or aggregation model suggests that upon receptor-ligand binding multiple receptors aggregate. SFKs have multiple phosphorylation sites that regulate their catalytic activity. If the kinase is associated with an NTR, aggregation brings two or more SFK into close proximity, which allows them to phosphorylate each other. Hence due to receptor aggregation, SFKs are activated leading to higher kinase activity and increased NTR phosphorylation. Evidence for this model is given by mathematical models and an experiment where artificially cross-linking NTRs led to signal induction. However, there is not sufficient evidence that receptor aggregation happens in vivo.

According to the Conformational change model, binding of a ligand induces a conformational change in the receptor such that the cytosolic domain becomes accessible for kinases. Thus phosphorylation is only possible when the receptor is bound to a ligand. However, structural studies have failed to show conformational changes.

The Kinetic segregation model proposes that RPTPs are physically excluded from NTR-ligand-binding regions. Ectodomains of RPTPs are much larger compared to NTRs and SFKs. The interaction between ligand and receptor brings the membranes into close contact, and the gap between membranes is too narrow for membrane proteins with large ectodomains to diffuse into the region. This increase the ratio of SFKs over RPTPs in the region surrounding the receptor-ligand complex. Any non-bound NTR would diffuse out of these regions too quickly to induce a downstream signal. Evidence for this model is given by the observation that in T cells, phosphatases CD45 and CD148 segregate from the T-cell receptor upon ligand binding. It was also shown that truncation of phosphatase ectodomains as well as the elongation of ligand ectodomains reduces the segregation and inhibits NTR triggering. Similar findings have been reported for Receptors, CD28 family receptors, Dectin-1.

=== Downstream signaling pathway ===
Phosphorylated tyrosine residues in cytoplasmic tails of NTRs serve as docking sites for SH2 domains of cytosolic signalling proteins. Once bound to the NTR they are activated by phosphorylation and can propagate the signal. Whether a receptor acts as an inhibitor or activator depends on the conserved tyrosine-containing motifs present in its cytoplasmic domain. Activatory motifs (ITAMs) bind kinases, such as Syk family kinases (e.g. ZAP70 for T-cell receptor) that phosphorylate a range of substrates, thereby inducing a signalling cascade leading to the activation of the leukocyte. Inhibitory motifs (ITIM) on the other hand recruit the cytoplasmic tyrosine phosphates SHP1, SHP2 and the phosphatidylinositol phosphatase SHIP-1. The phosphatases can attenuate the signal by dephosphorylating a broad range of signalling molecules.

=== Signal integration from multiple NTRs ===
At any given time, multiple NTR types can be engaged with their receptive ligands, inducing activatory, costimulatory as well as inhibitory signals. The functional response of the leukocytes depends on the integration of the signals.
