= T cell receptor revision =

T-cell receptor revision (alternative term: antigen receptor editing) is a process in the peripheral immune system which is used by mature T cells to alter their original antigenic specificity based on rearranged T cell receptors (TCR). This process can lead either to continuous appearance of potentially self-reactive T cells in the body, not controlled by the central tolerance mechanism in the thymus or better eliminate such self-reactive T cells on the other hand and thus contributing to peripheral tolerance – the extent of each has not been completely understood yet. This process occurs during follicular helper T cell formation in lymph node germinal centers.

T cell revision is achieved via reactivation of recombination enzymes RAG1 and/or RAG2 after T cell activation in the periphery and random recombination of their CDR sequences. Post-revision peripheral T cell repertoire is strengthening all essential features of self-tolerant and self-MHC-restricted T cell repertoire generated in the thymus while keeping all its hallmarks – reactivity towards foreign antigens and homeostatic proliferation in response to self-MHC, so-called tonic signaling.

== Background of T cell specificity regulation ==
The initial diversification processes (somatic V(D)J recombination or gene conversion and nucleotide addition) occur in the primary lymphoid organ (thymus) and lead to very high diversity (> 10^{14}) of TCRs, which are able to recognize almost any antigenic structure/sequence. The paradigm of adaptive immunity is that a single T cell is educated only in thymus and at the exit from thymus it can express only a single TCR with unique and definitive antigen specificity which cannot be modified. It is not correct since dual receptor T cells do exist in the periphery and the single receptor T cells can modify its specificity or regain a second TCR there. Those T cells recognizing self-structures (peptide/MHC complexes) are eliminated in the thymus immediately in a process of central tolerance, however it is not 100% effective again. As a result, there are many self-reactive T cells emigrating from thymus to the periphery and performing their effector functions there, including cytototoxic and helper activities, finally leading to autoimmunity. Peripheral tolerance is a mechanism controlling such autoreactive T cells in secondary lymphoid organs, blood circulation and all non-lymphoid tissues by different means. TCR revision process is generating much higher T cell plasticity in the development of the adaptive immune system than we have previously anticipated.

== Evidence for TCR revision ==
Activation-dependent T cell revision process is part of peripheral tolerance mechanisms if the new TCR specificity loses its autoreactive specificity as described in mouse transgenic and knock-in mouse models or in self-reactive conventional T cells in mouse or man. Since this process is random, it might also lead to de novo appearance of autoreactive TCRs on initially non-self reactive T cells or even switch between T cell lineages such as T regulatory cells and Th17 cells or gamma/delta and alpha/beta T cells.

The current knowledge on antigen receptor editing both in T cells and B cells is far from complete, but it has an essential impact on the central dogma of immunology - the control of adaptive immune cells, their specificity and regulation.
