= TRG =

TRG may refer to:

- Sako TRG, a bolt-action sniper rifle
- an acronym for the firearm technique Tap, Rack and Go
- Tactical Response Group, police tactical group in New South Wales, Australia
- Western Australia Police Tactical Response Group
- Tauranga Airport, New Zealand, IATA airport code
- The Racer's Group, an automobile racing team commonly known as TRG Motorsports
- The Regular Guys, a syndicated morning radio show
- Tory Reform Group, in the UK Conservative Party
- TRG Pakistan, a Pakistani holding company
- Traralgon railway station, Victoria, Australia, station code
- Tiny Rascal Gang, Asian street gang predominantly in the US
- Toyota Racing GmbH
- TRG (gene)
- Trg in some Slavic languages means approximately "town square", and is found in many place names, for example
  - Stari Trg (disambiguation)
  - Trg Nikole Pašića
