= Steven Marsh =

Steven Marsh may refer to:

- Steve Marsh (footballer) (1924–2024), Australian rules footballer
- Steve Marsh (cricketer) (born 1961), English cricketer from Kent
- Steve Marsh (comedian) (born 1979), British actor and co-host of the CBeebies programme Big Cook, Little Cook
- Steven Marsh (geneticist), authority on the subject of immunogenetics
- Stephen Marsh (luger) (born 1947), British luger
- Stephen R. Marsh, game writer formerly associated with TSR
- Steven Marsh (game designer), game designer who has worked for Steve Jackson Games
