= HLA Informatics Group =

The HLA Informatics Group (HIG) is a research group led by Professor Steven Marsh at the Anthony Nolan Research Institute that develops, runs and maintains the IMGT (immunogenetics)/HLA (Human leukocyte antigen) Database and the IPD (immuno polymorphism database). The IMGT/HLA database originated as part of IMGT and was merged with IPD in 2003. The IMGT/HLA Database is a central repository for sequences of the human major histocompatibility complex and currently contains over 5,000 allele sequences, including over 1,800 HLA-B sequences.

As well as sequence information, the IMGT/HLA Database and the IPD Databases include extensive information regarding the source material that sequences are derived from.

The IMGT/HLA website is the main source to know how many HLA alleles have been discovered.
