= Stari Trg =

Stari Trg or Stari trg means "old square" or "old market town" in several South Slavic languages and may refer to:

== Kosovo ==
- Stari Trg (village), a village in the Municipality of Mitrovica
- Stari Trg (mining settlement), a village in the Municipality of Mitrovica

=== Other ===
- Stari Trg mine, one of the largest lead and zinc mines in Kosovo

== Slovenia ==
- Stari Trg, Ivančna Gorica, a settlement in the Municipality of Ivančna Gorica
- Stari Trg, Slovenj Gradec, a settlement in the City Municipality of Slovenj Gradec
- Stari Trg, Trebnje, a former settlement in the Municipality of Trebnje
- Stari Trg ob Kolpi, a settlement in the Municipality of Črnomelj

== See also ==
- TRG (disambiguation)
