= Kinetic-segregation model of T cell activation =

Model for the mechanism of T-cell receptor triggering

Kinetic-segregation is a model proposed for the mechanism of T-cell receptor (TCR) triggering. It offers an explanation for how TCR binding to its ligand triggers T-cell activation, based on size-sensitivity for the molecules involved. Simon J. Davis and Anton van der Merwe, University of Oxford, proposed this model in 1996. According to the model, TCR signalling is initiated by segregation of phosphatases with large extracellular domains from the TCR complex when binding to its ligand, allowing small kinases to phosphorylate intracellular domains of the TCR without inhibition. Its might also be applicable to other receptors of the Non-catalytic tyrosine-phosphorylated receptors family such as CD28.

== Mechanism ==
On plasma membrane of a T cell there is the T-cell receptor (consists of α,β chains and multiple CD3 adaptor proteins), as well as molecules that induce signalling (tyrosine kinase Lck phosphorylates ITAMs in CD3 complex) and factors that inhibit signalling (tyrosine phosphatases CD45 and CD148). In the resting T-cell, all molecules are repeatedly colliding by means of diffusion. The TCR/CD3 complex is constantly being phosphorylated by Lck. Because of an abundance of CD45 and CD148 in the cell membrane, phosphorylations are readily removed before they can recruit downstream signalling molecules. Overall phosphorylation of the TCR is low and tonic TCR signalling is avoided.

The TCR/peptide-MHC complex, formed when a T cell recognises its ligand on an antigen presenting cell (APC) and the T-cell-APC contact occurs, spans a short length. This results in the formation of close contact zones between the membranes of the T cell and antigen presenting cell (~15 nm apart) around the TCR/peptide-MHC complex. Phosphatases CD45 and CD148 with much larger ectodomains than TCR are sterically excluded from the close contact zones, while the region is still accessible for the small kinase Lck. This perturbs the balance of kinase activity to phosphatase activity and ITAM phosphorylation is strongly favoured. Such prolonged phosphorylation of ITAMs by Lck kinase allows time for ZAP-70 recruitment, its activation by phosphorylation and subsequent phosphorylation of adaptor proteins LAT and SLP-76. Full T-cell activation is initiated by multiple triggering events described above. When T-cell and APC membranes separate, the close-contact zone vanishes and large-ectodomain tyrosine phosphatases are allowed to restore the ground state.

=== Supporting evidence ===
During ligand binding, CD45 and CD148 are excluded from the TCR region. It was also shown that both the truncation of CD45 and CD148 (hence are able to enter the close contact zone) and the elongation of the MHC inhibit TCR triggering. Furthermore CAR cell function is affected by the size of the ligand it recognises. Finally, T cells can be activated by pMHC immobilised on a plate surface but not by soluble, monomeric pMHC, providing evidence that TCR triggering depends on restricting width between two membranes.

== Kinetic segregation as model for other signalling receptors ==
=== Antibody-induced signaling by CD28 ===
In the resting T-cell there is no net phosphorylation of CD28 (one of the molecules providing co-stimulatory signals required for T-cell activation). Kinetic-segregation model uses here the same explanation as it provides for low net phosphorylation of TCR in the resting T-cell described previously.

Binding of both conventional and superagonistic (mitogenic) antibodies in suspension does not constrict the dephosphorylation effect of phosphatases acting on CD28. However, when these antibodies are immobilized (either by secondary antibody bound to plastic or by Fc receptors on other cells) considerable steric constraints emerge. It is of note, that the immobilized conventional antibody poses less prominent spatial constraints than the immobilized superagonistic antibody. CD45 phosphatase is not completely excluded from the close-contact zone and thus the signal generated in the case of a conventional antibody is weaker. Immobilized superagonistic antibodies bound to CD28 exclude CD45 phosphatases completely and the signal leading to T-cell activation is stronger.

=== Further applications ===
The tyrosine kinase Lck functions either in conjunction with a co-receptor molecule (CD4 or CD8) or as a free Lck kinase. The kinetic-segregation model might be applied to both co-receptor dependent and co-receptor independent signaling through TCR.

== See also ==
- Non-catalytic tyrosine-phosphorylated receptor
- T-cell receptor
