= CD28 family receptor =

Group of regulatory cell surface receptors

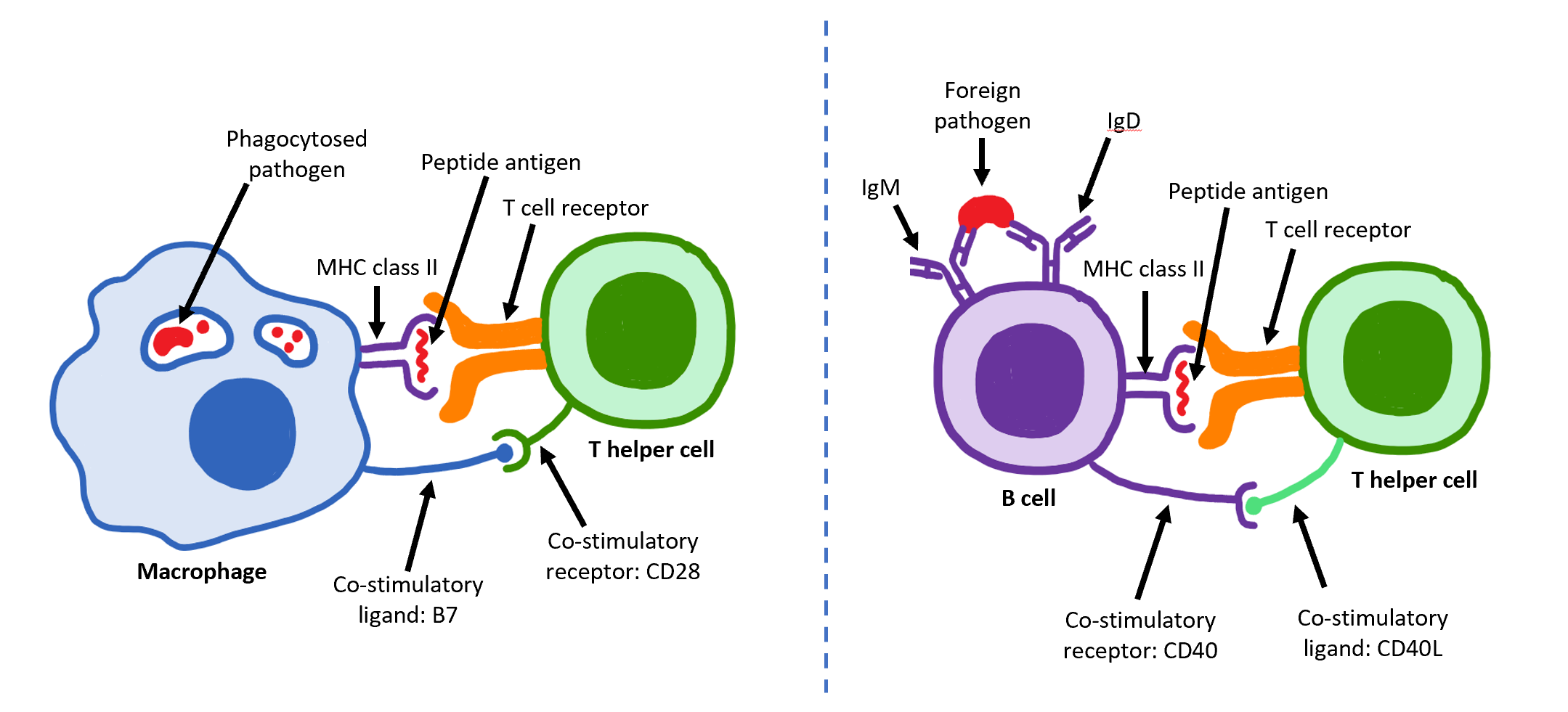
The left image is a visual of CD28 attached to a T cell interacting in costimulation with B7 to activate the T cell and promote an immune response.

CD28 family receptors are a group of regulatory cell surface receptors expressed on immune cells. The CD28 family in turn is a subgroup of the immunoglobulin superfamily.

Two family members, CD28 and ICOS, act as positive regulators of T cell function while another three, BTLA, CTLA-4 and PD-1 act as inhibitors. Ligands for the CD28 receptor family include B7 family proteins.

CD28 receptors play a role in the development and proliferation of T cells. The CD28 receptors enhance signals from the T cell receptors (TCR) in order to stimulate an immune response and an anti-inflammatory response on regulatory T cells. Through the promotion of T cell function, CD28 receptors allow effector T cells to combat regulatory T cell-mediated suppression from adaptive immunity. CD28 receptors also elicit the prevention of spontaneous autoimmunity.

== Function ==
CD28 receptors aid in other T cell processes such as cytoskeletal remodeling, production of cytokines and chemokines and intracellular biochemical reactions (i.e. phosphorylation, transcriptional signaling, and metabolism) that are key for T cell proliferation and differentiation. Ligation of CD28 receptors causes epigenetic, transcriptional and post-translational alterations in T cells. Specifically, CD28 costimulation controls many aspects within T cells, one being the expression of proinflammatory cytokine genes. A particular cytokine gene encodes for IL-2, which influences T cell proliferation, survival, and differentiation. The absence of CD28 costimulation results in the loss of IL-2 production causing the T cells to be anergic. Additionally, CD28 ligation causes arginine-methylation for many proteins. CD28 also drives transcription within T cells and produce signals that lead to IL-2 production and Bcl-xL regulation, an antiapoptotic protein, which are essential for T cell survival. CD28 receptors can be seen on 80% of human CD4+ and 50% of CD8+ T cells, in which this percentage decreases with age.

== Clinical significance ==
=== Cancer ===
Some cancer cells evade destruction by the immune system through an overexpression of B7 ligands that bind to inhibitory CD28 family member receptors on immune cells. Antibodies directed against CD28 family members CTLA-4, PD-1, or their B7 ligands function as checkpoint inhibitors to overcome tumor immune tolerance and are clinically used in cancer immunotherapy.

Additionally, genetically engineered T cells containing CD28 and CD137 can be used in a molecularly targeted therapy response to a type of carcinomas called mesothelin. These T cells have a high affinity for human mesothelin. Upon mesothelin stimulation, the T cells proliferate, express an antiapoptotic gene, and secrete cytokines with the help of CD28 expression. When introduced to mice with pre-existing tumors, these T cells remove the tumors completely. The CD137 presence within the cells maintains the persistence of the engineered T cells. This interaction between engineered T cells with CD28 and CD137 are essential for immunotherapy, and show promise for directing T lymphocytes to tumor antigens and altering the tumor microenvironment for mesothelin.

=== HIV ===
The CD28 pathway is targeted by the human immunodeficiency virus (HIV) as the virus infects large numbers of normal cells. CD28 has effects on the transcription and stability of interleukin-2 and IFN-γ, cytokines that are important for immunity and stimulating NK cells. HIV alters the CD28 signaling as well as CD8 cells. As a result, there are reduced levels of CD8 cells, which express CD28, in individuals with HIV. With regards to subjects with both Hepatitis C Virus (HCV) and HIV, levels of CD8 cells are also reduced. CD28 signaling has a large role in the adaptive response to HCV and can increase morbidity for HCV/HIV coinfection within a subject. CD28 induces IL-2 secretion that increases IL-2 mRNA stability. CD28 costimulation influences the expression of key genes expressed in T cell differentiation. Tat, a regulatory protein that regulates viral transcription, increases the transcription of the HIV dsDNA. CD28 costimulation with the Tat protein can contribute to chronic immune hyperactivation seen among HIV-infected individuals. Thus, CD28 is an essential part of therapeutics for the infection and pathogenesis of HIV.

=== Hyper-induced inflammatory cytokines ===
Binding CD28 to superantigens can induce an overexpression of inflammatory cytokines which may be harmful. When CD28 interacts with coligand B7-2, these superantigens elicit T-cell hyperactivation. Superantigens can form this overexpression by controlling interactions between MHC-II and TCRs as well as increasing the B7-2 and CD28 costimulatory interactions. This is dangerous because the overexpression of inflammatory cytokines can cause toxic shock in an individual.
