= ImmTAC =

Biological drug for the treatment of cancer

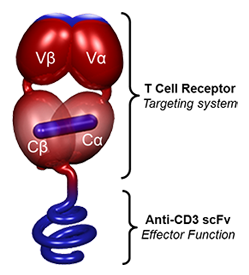
Schematic representation of an ImmTAC. The alpha and beta chains of the TCR (red) are linked through a disulphide bond (blue bar) introduced artificially between the TCR constant domains. The TCR variable and constant domains are as indicated. The anti-CD3 scFv effector function is fused to the TCR beta chain.

ImmTACs (Immune mobilising monoclonal T-cell receptors Against Cancer) are a class of bispecific biological drug being investigated for the treatment of cancer and viral infections which combines engineered cancer-recognizing TCRs with immune activating complexes. ImmTACs target cancerous or virally infected cells through binding human leukocyte antigen (HLA) presented peptide antigens and redirect the host's cytotoxic T cells to recognise and kill them.

ImmTACs are fusion proteins that combine an engineered T Cell Receptor (TCR) based targeting system with a single chain antibody fragment (scFv) effector function. TCRs, like antibodies, constitute an important antigen recognition system within the immune system; but, whereas antibodies are restricted to targeting cell surface or secreted proteins TCRs can recognise peptides derived from intracellular targets presented by human leukocyte antigen (HLA). Naturally occurring TCRs are low affinity (0.18-387 micromolar range) 2-chain membrane receptors expressed on the surface of T cells. To produce stable, soluble, high affinity TCRs capable of being used as diagnostics and therapeutics the two TCR protein chains are stabilised through the introduction of a novel disulphide bond between the 2 constant domains and the affinity increased 1-5 million fold to low picomolar values through phage display affinity maturation. To provide the soluble, affinity enhanced TCR with a biological effector function the beta chain of the TCR is fused to an scFv antibody fragment specific for the CD3 T cell co-receptor, creating an ImmTAC. The molecular weight of an ImmTAC molecule is ~75kDa.

== Mechanism of action ==
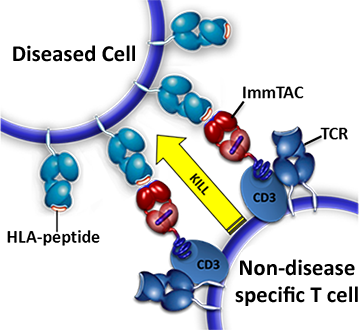
A schematic representation of the mechanism of action for ImmTACs

ImmTACs exert their activity through T cell redirection, a mechanism of action used by several other bi-specific biologics such as the Bi-specific T-cell engagers (BiTEs). After administration of the drug the picomolar affinity TCR portion of the ImmTAC binds to the cancerous or virally infected cell through specific recognition of target HLA-peptide complexes on their cell surface. This picomolar affinity binding results in the diseased cells becoming coated in CD3 co-receptor specific scFv antibody fragments that constitute the ImmTAC effector function. Any Cytotoxic T cell that subsequently comes into direct physical contact with the ImmTAC coated diseased cell is redirected to kill it, regardless of the specificity of its native TCR. This redirected killing does not require binding of any co-stimulatory molecules and is effected through the targeted release of perforin and granzyme from the redirected T cell that induces the targeted disease cell to die through an apoptosis mediated mechanism. However, the danger of activating a wide variety of nonspecific cytotoxic T cell clones via anti-CD3 scFv exists, leading to their proliferation and widespread autoimmunity.
