= IMGT =

Content
- Description: Nucleic sequences, amino acids, annotations, and tools related to the adaptive immune system.
- Organisms: Vertebrate
- Release date: 1989; 36 years ago

Access
- Website: IMGT

IMGT or the international ImMunoGeneTics information system is a collection of databases and resources for immunoinformatics, particularly the V, D, J, and C gene sequences, as well as a providing other tools and data related to the adaptive immune system. IMGT/LIGM-DB, the first and still largest database hosted as part of IMGT contains reference nucleotide sequences for 360 species' T-cell receptor and immunoglobulin molecules, as of 2023. These genes encode the proteins which are the foundation of adaptive immunity, which allows highly specific recognition and memory of pathogens.

== History ==
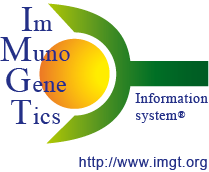
The logo of IMGT

IMGT was founded in June, 1989, by Marie-Paule Lefranc, an immunologist working at University of Montpellier. The project was presented to the 10th Human Genome Mapping Workshop, and resulted in the recognition of V, D, J, and C regions as genes. The first resource created was IMGT/LIGM-DB, a reference for nucleotide sequences of T-cell receptor and immunoglobulin of humans, and later vertebrate species. IMGT was created under the auspices of Laboratoire d'ImmunoGénétique Moléculaire at the University of Montpellier as well as French National Centre for Scientific Research (CNRS).

As both T-cell receptors and immunoglobulin molecules are built through a process of recombination of nucleotide sequences, the annotation of the building block regions and their role is unique within the genome. To standardize terminology and references, the IMGT-NC was created in 1992 and recognized by the International Union of Immunological Societies as a nomenclature subcommittee. Other tools include IMGT/Collier-de-Perles, a method for two dimensional representation of receptor amino acid sequences, and IMGT/mAb-DB, a database of monoclonal antibodies. Now maintained by the HLA Informatics Group, the primary reference for human HLA, IPD-IMGT/HLA Database, originated in part with IMGT. It was merged with the Immuno Polymorphism Database in 2003 to form the current reference.

Since 2015, IMGT has been headed by Sofia Kossida.

== See also ==
- Open science data
- Computational immunology
- Immunomics
