= Central tolerance =

Elimination of autoreactive lymphocytes by the immune system

In immunology, central tolerance (also known as negative selection) is the process of eliminating any developing T or B lymphocytes that are autoreactive, i.e. reactive to the body itself. Through elimination of autoreactive lymphocytes, tolerance ensures that the immune system does not attack self peptides. Lymphocyte maturation (and central tolerance) occurs in primary lymphoid organs such as the bone marrow and the thymus. In mammals, B cells mature in the bone marrow and T cells mature in the thymus.

Central tolerance is not perfect, so peripheral tolerance exists as a secondary mechanism to ensure that T and B cells are not self-reactive once they leave primary lymphoid organs. Peripheral tolerance is distinct from central tolerance in that it occurs once developing immune cells exit primary lymphoid organs (the thymus and bone-marrow), prior to their export into the periphery.

== Function ==
Central tolerance is essential to proper immune cell functioning because it helps ensure that mature B cells and T cells do not recognize self-antigens as foreign microbes. More specifically, central tolerance is necessary because T cell receptors (TCRs) and B cell receptors (BCRs) are made by cells through random somatic rearrangement. This process, known as V(D)J recombination, is important because it increases the receptor diversity which increases the likelihood that B cells and T cells will have receptors for novel antigens. Junctional diversity occurs during recombination and serves to further increase the diversity of BCRs and TCRs. The production of random TCRs and BCRs is an important method of defense against microbes due to their high mutation rate. This process also plays an important role in promoting the survival of a species, because there will be a variety of receptor arrangements within a species – this enables a very high chance of at least one member of the species having receptors for a novel antigen.

While the process of somatic recombination is essential to a successful immune defense, it can lead to autoreactivity. For example, lack of functional RAG1/2, enzymes necessary for somatic recombination, has been linked to development of immune cytopenias in which antibodies are produced against the patient's blood cells. Due to the nature of a random receptor recombination, there will be some BCRs and TCRs produced that recognize self antigens as foreign. This is problematic, since these B and T cells would, if activated, mount an immune response against self if not killed or inactivated by central tolerance mechanisms. Therefore, without central tolerance, the immune system could attack self, which is not sustainable and could result in an autoimmune disorder.

== Mechanism ==
The result of central tolerance is a population of lymphocytes that do not mount immune response towards self-antigens. These cells use their TCR or BCR specificity to recognize foreign antigens, in order to play their specific roles in immune reaction against those antigens.

In this way, the mechanisms of central tolerance ensure that lymphocytes that would recognise self-antigens in a way that could endanger the host, are not released into the periphery.

It is of note that T cells, despite tolerance mechanisms, are at least to some extent self-reactive. TCR of conventional T cells must be able to recognize parts of major histocompatibility complex (MHC) molecules (MHC class I in case of CD8+ T cells or MHC class II in case of CD4+ T cells) to create proper interaction with antigen-presenting cell. Furthermore, TCRs of regulatory T cells (Treg cells) are directly reactive towards self-antigens (although their self-reactivity is not very strong) and use this autoreactivity to regulate immune reactions by suppressing immune system when it should not be active. Importantly, lymphocytes can only develop tolerance towards antigens that are present in the bone marrow (for B cells) and thymus (for T cells).

=== T cell ===
T cell progenitors (also called thymocytes) are created in the bone marrow and then migrate to the thymus where they continue their development. During this development, the thymocytes perform the V(D)J recombination and some of the developing T cell clones produce TCR that is completely unfunctional (unable to bind peptide-MHC complexes) and some produce TCR that is self-reactive and could therefore promote autoimmunity. These "problematic" clones are therefore removed from the pool of T cells by specific mechanisms.

First, during "positive selection" the thymocytes are tested, whether their TCR works properly and those with unfunctional TCR are removed by apoptosis. The mechanism has its name because it selects for survival only those thymocytes whose TCRs do interact with peptide-MHC complexes on antigen presenting cells in the thymus.

During the late stage of positive selection, another process called "MHC restriction" (or lineage commitment) takes place. In this process the thymocytes whose TCR recognize MHCI (MHC class I) molecules become CD4- CD8+ and thymocytes whose TCR recognize MHCII (MHC class II) become CD4+ CD8-.

Subsequently, the positively selected thymocytes go through "negative selection" which tests the thymocytes for self-reactivity. The cells that are strongly self-reactive (and therefore prone to attacking the host cells) are removed by apoptosis. Thymocytes that are still self-reactive, but only slightly develop into T regulatory (Treg) cells. Thymocytes that are not self-reactive become mature naïve T cells. Both the Treg and mature naïve T cells subsequently migrate to the secondary lymphoid organs. The negative selection has its name because it selects for survival only those thymocytes whose TCRs do not interact (or interact only slightly) with peptide-MHC complexes on antigen presenting cells in the thymus.

Two other terms - recessive and dominant tolerance are also important regarding the T cell central tolerance. Both the terms refer to two possible ways of tolerance establishment towards particular antigen (typically self antigen). The "recessive tolerance" means that the antigen is tolerated via deletion of those T cells that would facilitate immune response against the antigen (deletion of autoreactive cells in negative selection). The "dominant tolerance" means that the T cell clones specific for the antigen are deviated into Treg cells and therefore suppress the immune response against the antigen (Treg selection during the negative selection).

Steps of T cell tolerance

1. Development of T cell progenitors T cell precursors originate from bone marrow (BM). Population of the earliest hematopoietic progenitors do not bear markers of differentiated cells (for that they are called Lin- "lineage negative") but express molecules such as SCA1 (stem cell antigen) and KIT (receptor for stem cell factor SCF). Based on these markers the cells are called LSKs (Lineage-SCA1-KIT). This population can be further divided, based on expression of markers such as CD150 and FMS-related tyrosine kinase 3 (FLT3), into CD150+ FLT3-hematopoietic stem cells (HSCs) and CD150- FLT3low multipotent progenitors (MPPs). The HSCs are "true hematopoietic stem cells" because they have the ability of self-renewal (generating new HSCs) and also have the potential to differentiate into all blood cell types. The direct descendants of HSCs are the more mature multipotent progenitors (MPPs) that highly proliferate, can differentiate into all blood cell types but are not capable of self-renewal (do not have the ability to indefinitely generate new MPPs and therefore HSCs are needed for generation of new MPPs). Some of the MPPs further upregulate expression of FLT3 (becoming CD150- FLT3high) and start to upregulate genes specific for lymphoid lineage (for example Rag1) (but remain Lin-). These progenitors (still belong to the LSK cells) consist of two similar populations termed lymphoid-primed MPPs (LMPPs) and early lymphoid progenitors (ELPs). The LMPPs/ELPs subsequently give rise to common lymphoid progenitors (CLPs). These cells (FLT3high LIN- KITlow) do not belong to LSK pool, are more mature and more prone towards the lymphoid lineage, meaning that under normal circumstances they will ultimately give rise to T or B cells or other lymphocytes (NK cells). But since they are only progenitors, their cell fate is not strictly predetermined and they still have the ability to differentiate into other lineages.
2. Migration into the thymus Progenitors from bone marrow (BM), even the HSCs, have the ability to randomly exit the BM to the bloodstream and thus can be readily detected there. Therefore, after being generated, the T cell progenitors exit the BM and are randomly carried by blood throughout the body. At the moment they reach postcapillary venules in the thymic cortico-medullary junction, they start slowing down and rolling on the endothelium, because all the progenitors, including LSK cells, express on their surface glycoprotein PSGL1, which is a ligand for P-selectin, expressed on the thymic endothelium. But out of all the aforementioned T cell progenitors, only the LMPPs/ELPs and CLPs express chemokine receptors CCR7 and CCR9 that enable them to enter the thymus. The thymic endothelium express chemokines CCL19 and CCL21, which are ligands for CCR7 and CCL25 which is a ligand for CCR9. The final part of thymic entry is not yet fully understood. Suggested model is that receptor sensing of chemokines by the progenitors activates their integrins (suggested integrins are VLA-4 and LFA-1) which engage with ligands on the endothelium. This interaction stops the rolling, leads to cellular arrest and finally to transmigration along the chemokine gradient inside thymus. Therefore, all the progenitors will be rolling on the thymic endothelium, but only the LMPPs/ELPs and CLPs will enter the thymus because only they have the proper receptor equipment to do so. The mechanism is highly similar to the transmigration, which is used by leukocytes to enter lymph nodes or inflamed tissues.
3. Early thymic development From the moment LMPPs/ETPs and CLPs enter the thymus in the corticomedullary junction, they are referred to as thymus settling progenitors (TSPs). The TSPs highly proliferate and start to migrate to the subcapsullar zone of the thymus. It is not celar what signals drive the migration. One possibility is that they migrate along chemokine gradients, using CXCR4, CCR7 and CCR9 receptors but the migration can be also driven only by interactions of integrins and other cells and ECM (extra-cellular matrix) without direct involvement of chemokines. As they migrate towards the subcapsular zone, the TSPs further continue in their differentiation, which is driven mainly by the thymic microenvironment. Out of many signals the TSPs and other subsequent precursors receive from the microenvironment, the Notch signalling is especially important to drive their differentiation fate. The precursors express Notch1 receptor which is activated by ligands present in the thymic tissue. The subsequent activation of Notch pathway leads to gradual loss of the progenitors capability to generate other cell lineages and they ultimately become only capable to create T cells but this comes at the later stages of the differentiation. At the stage of TSPs, the progenitors still retain the capacity to create both lymphoid and myeloid cells. Given their capability to generate other cell lineages (mainly in vitro) it is even debated that they can physiologically, at least partially contribute to generation of other cell types, present in the thymus, mainly plasmacytoid dendritic cells (pDCs). But this has not yet been clearly proven.
4. DN to DP stages In the next step, the TSPs give rise to early thymic precursors (ETPs), also called as double negative 1 (DN1) cells. The term "double negative" refers to the fact that at this stage the precursors do not express CD4 nor CD8 coreceptors (sometimes they are even termed "triple negative" because they also do not express CD3 complex). The DN stages can be distinguished by the expression of surface markers CD44 and CD25, with the DN1 cells being CD44+ CD25-. Similarly to the TSPs, the DN1 cells are still capable of generating other cell types aside from T cells, such as B cells, NK cells, DCs and macrophages (lymphoid and myeloid lineage). But, due to the Notch signalling, they start to committing towards T cell lineage by expression of transcription factors (TFs) such as GATA3 and TCF1. Subsequently, the DN1 cells differentiate into DN2 cells, that are CD44+ and CD25+. The DN2 stage can be further divided into two substages DN2a and DN2b. The transition from the earlier DN2a substage to the later DN2b is also called commitement, because it is at this moment when the T cell precursor finally and completely lose their ability to generate other cell lineages and from that moment they can (even in vitro) only differentiate into T cells. After the commitement, at the DN2b substage, the precursors also start to produce CD3 complex (signalling component of the future TCR receptor complex). Next, the precursors continue their differentiation into DN3 phase in which they are CD44- CD25+. At this stage, the cells finally arrive to the subcapsular zone of the thymus, further proliferate and most importantly, start to express Rag1 and Rag2 (recombinases of the V(D)J recombination of T or B cell receptors). Therefore, it is the DN3 stage at which the T cell precursors start to build their TCRs. It is also at this stage when the precursors decide whether they become αβ or γδ T cell. There are two possible models of how this decision step is made. The first possibility is that the cell fate is simply determined during the development of the precursor by the commitment similar to the development of other cell lineages. Therefore, some T cell precursors commit to γδ T cell and therefore in this step recombine γδTCR and some commit to αβ T cell and similarly recombine αβTCR. The other and generally more accepted model is that the commitment is determined during the TCR rearrangement and formation. Since the V(D)J recombination is step-by-step process, the precursors firstly recombine their genes to produce γδTCR. At the moment, the strength of signal that is produced by the newly formed TCR decides. If the γδTCR is properly formed and receives strong signal by interacting with the ligands present in the thymus, then the precursor continue its development into γδ T cell through specific selection processes. If the T cell precursor receives only weak signal, then the γδTCR formation is scratched and the recombination towards αβTCR starts. Those precursors firstly recombine TCRβ chain and combine it with invariant TCRα (substitute chain) and in previous stages formed CD3 complex to create so-called pre-TCR. With this premature TCR, they enter process called β-selection. This is a control step, in which the progenitor needs to receive positive signal from the pre-TCR to survive. They further need signal from CXCR4 (ligand is CXCL12) which does not serve here to direct migration but as a survival signal along with Notch signalling. Therefore, the β-selection step controls whether the TCRβ chain is properly formed and functional. It can be also understood as a positive selection specific only for the TCRβ chain (TCRα chain is not yet formed) but control for self-reactivity is not included in this step and comes later, especially in the medullary section. The cells that do not create functional γδTCR or pre-TCR or do not successfully pass through β-selection are removed by apoptosis. The cells that successfully pass the β-selection continue their development into DN4 stage, stop the expression of CD25 becoming CD44- CD25- and begin migration inside thymic cortex. It is, again, not completely clear what drives the migration. Probably, the receptors CXCR4 and CXCR9 on the DN4 cells drive the migration along gradients of chemokines CXCL12 and CCL25, although other models of migration to the cortex were established mainly based on movement dynamics of cells due to their extensive proliferation or fluid currents in the thymus without direct involvement of chemokine-driven migration. The DN4 cells subsequently begin the expression of CD8 and CD4 coreceptors becoming CD8+ CD4+ DP cells (DP means double positive because they express both the coreceptors). Once in the thymic cortex, the DP cells finalize the rearrangement of TCRα chain, which results in production of complete αβTCR complex, which marks the cells ready to enter the positive selection, which takes place in the thymic cortex.
5. During positive selection, T cells are checked for their ability to bind peptide-MHC complexes with affinity. If the T cell cannot bind the MHC class I or MHC class II complex, it does not receive survival signals, so it dies via apoptosis. T cell receptors with sufficient affinity for peptide-MHC complexes are selected for survival.
  - Depending on whether the T cell binds MHC I or II, it will become a CD8+ or CD4+ T cell, respectively.
  - Positive selection occurs in the thymic cortex with the help of thymic epithelial cells that contain surface MHC I and MHC II molecules.
6. During negative selection, T cells are tested for their affinity to self. If they bind a self peptide, then they are signaled to apoptose (process of clonal deletion).
  - The thymic epithelial cells display self antigen to the T cells to test their affinity for self.
  - Transcriptional regulators AIRE and Fezf2 play important roles in the expression of self tissue antigens on the thymic epithelial cells in the thymus.
  - Negative selection occurs in the cortico-medullary junction and in the thymic medulla.
7. The T cells that do not bind self, but do recognize antigen/MHC complexes, and are either CD4+ or CD8+, migrate to secondary lymphoid organs as mature naïve T cells.

Regulatory T cells are another type of T cell that mature in the thymus. Selection of T reg cells occurs in the thymic medulla and is accompanied by the transcription of FOXP3. T reg cells are important for regulating autoimmunity by suppressing the immune system when it should not be active.

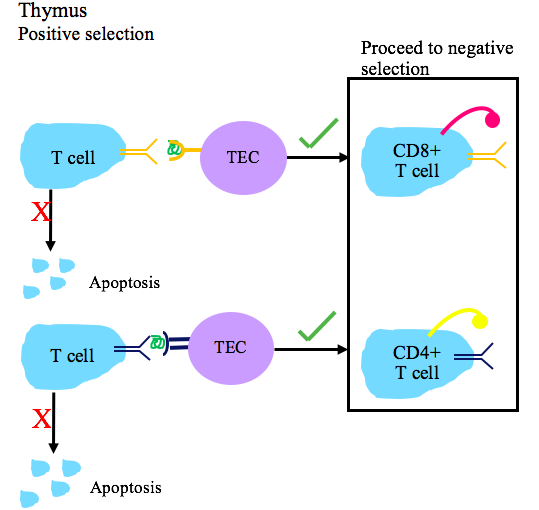
This figure depicts the process of positive selection and MHC restriction for T cells.

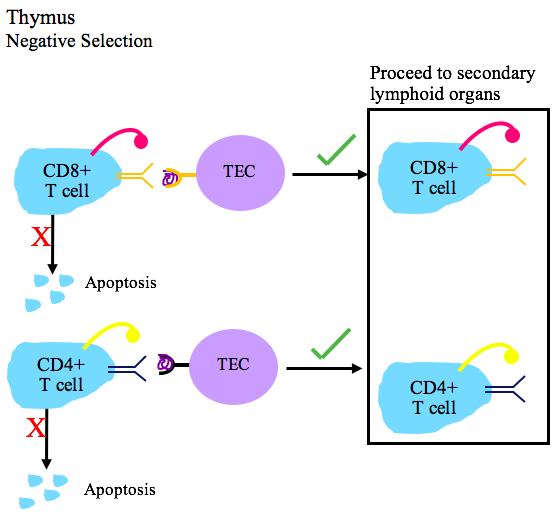
This figure depicts the process of negative selection for T cells.

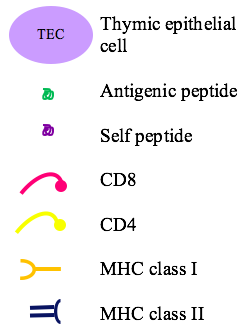
Legend for T cell selection figures.

=== B cell ===
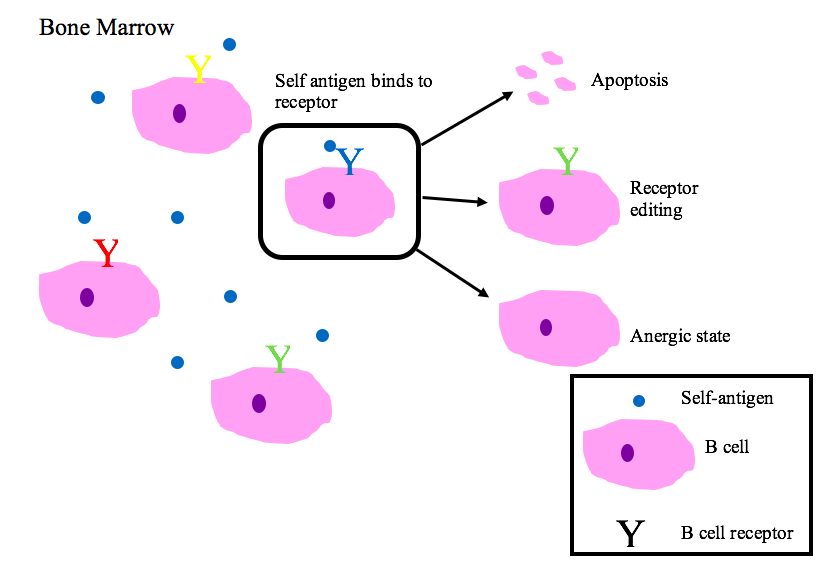
This figure depicts the process of B cell selection in the bone marrow.

Immature B cells in the bone marrow undergo negative selection when they bind self peptides.

Properly functioning B cell receptors recognize non-self antigen, or pathogen-associated molecular proteins (PAMPs).

Main outcomes of autoreactivity of BCRs

1. Apoptosis (clonal deletion)
2. Receptor editing: the self-reactive B cell changes specificity by rearranging genes and develops a new BCR that does not respond to self. This process gives the B cell a chance for editing the BCR before it is signaled to apoptose or becomes anergic.
3. Induction of anergy (a state of non-reactivity)

== Genetic diseases ==
Genetic defects in central tolerance can lead to autoimmunity.

- Autoimmune Polyendocrinopathy Syndrome Type I is caused by mutations in the human gene AIRE. This leads to a lack of expression of peripheral antigens in the thymus, and hence a lack of negative selection towards key peripheral proteins such as insulin. Multiple autoimmune symptoms result.

== History ==
The first use of the term "tolerance" in this context was by Ray Owen in 1945 when he noticed that dizygotic twin cattle did not produce antibodies when one of the twins was injected with the other's blood. His findings were confirmed by later experiments by Hasek and Billingham. The results were explained by Burnet's clonal selection hypothesis. Burnet and Medawar won the Nobel Prize in 1960 for their work in explaining how immune tolerance works.

== See also ==
- Autoimmunity
- Immunology
- Peripheral tolerance
