= TRD (gene) =

Protein-coding gene in the species Homo sapiens

Identifiers
- Aliases: TRD, TCRD, TCRDV1, TRD@, T cell receptor delta locus, T-cell receptor delta locus
- External IDs: GeneCards: TRD; OMA:TRD - orthologs
Orthologs
Species	Human	Mouse
Entrez	6964	n/a
Ensembl	n/a	n/a
UniProt	n a	n/a
RefSeq (mRNA)	n/a	n/a
RefSeq (protein)	n/a	n/a
Location (UCSC)	n/a	n/a
PubMed search		n/a
- Wikidata
View/Edit Human

T cell receptor delta locus (symbol TRD), also known as TCRD or TRD@, is a protein that in humans is encoded by the TRD gene. It contributes the delta (δ) chain to the larger TCR protein (T-cell receptor).
