= Receptor editing =

Receptor editing is a process that occurs during the maturation of B cells, which are part of the adaptive immune system. This process forms part of central tolerance to attempt to change the specificity of the antigen receptor of self reactive immature B-cells, in order to rescue them from programmed cell death, called apoptosis. It is thought that 20-50% of all peripheral naive B cells have undergone receptor editing making it the most common method of removing self reactive B cells.

During maturation in the bone marrow, B cells are tested for interaction with self antigens, which is called negative selection. If the maturing B cells strongly interact with these self antigens, they undergo death by apoptosis. Negative selection is important to avoid the production of B cells that could cause autoimmune diseases. They can avoid apoptosis by modifying the sequence of light chain V and J genes (components of the antigen receptor) so that they have a different specificity and may not recognize self-antigens anymore. This process of changing the specificity of the immature B cell receptor is called receptor editing.
