= TRA (gene) =

Protein-coding gene in the species Homo sapiens

Identifiers
- Aliases: TRA, IMD7, TCRA, TRA@, TRAC, T-cell receptor alpha locus, TCRD, T cell receptor alpha locus
- External IDs: GeneCards: TRA; OMA:TRA - orthologs
Orthologs
Species	Human	Mouse
Entrez	6955	n/a
Ensembl	n/a	n/a
UniProt	P0DSE1	n/a
RefSeq (mRNA)	n/a	n/a
RefSeq (protein)	n/a	n/a
Location (UCSC)	n/a	n/a
PubMed search		n/a
- Wikidata
View/Edit Human

T-cell receptor alpha locus is a protein that in humans is encoded by the TRA gene, also known as TCRA or TRA@. It contributes the alpha chain to the larger TCR protein (T-cell receptor).
