= Cytosolic 5'-nucleotidase 3A =

Enzyme found in humans

NT5C3A
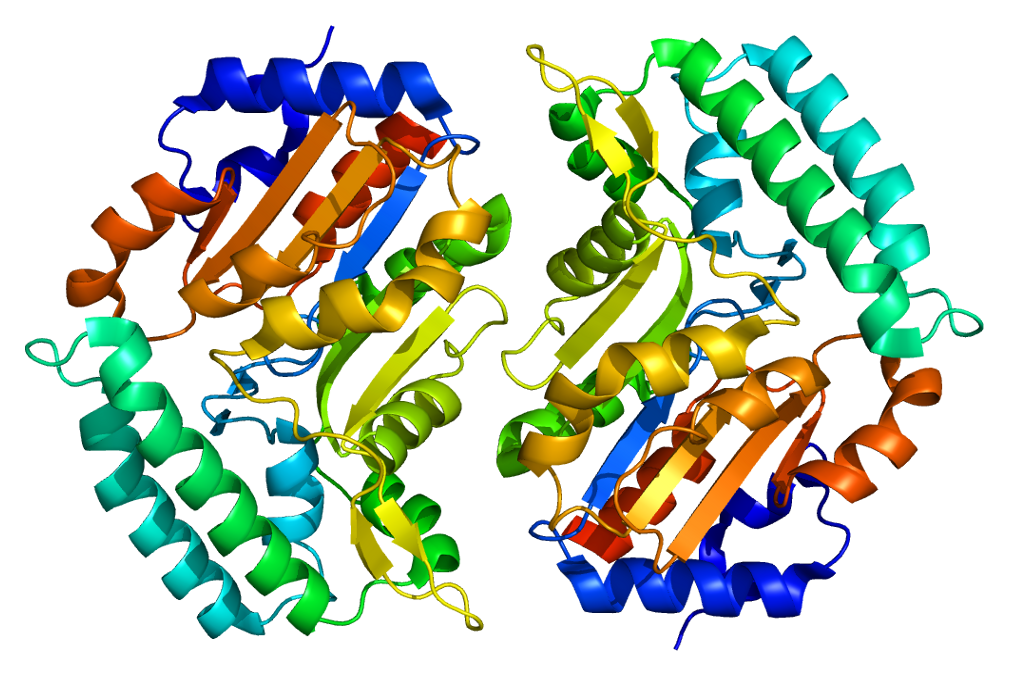

Identifiers
- Aliases: NT5C3A, NT5C3, P5'N-1, P5N-1, PN-I, POMP, PSN1, UMPH, UMPH1, cN-III, hUMP1, p36, 5'-nucleotidase, cytosolic IIIA
- External IDs: OMIM: 606224; MGI: 1927186; GeneCards: NT5C3A
Available structures
PDB	Ortholog search: PDBe RCSB
PDB	List of PDB id codes 2CN1, 2JGA, 2VKQ
Enzyme activity
EC #	BRENDA	ExPASy	KEGG	MetaCyc
3.1.3.5	↗	↗	↗	↗
3.1.3.91	↗	↗	↗	↗

Gene location (Human)
Chr.	Chromosome 7 (human)
Band	7p14.3	Start	33,014,114 bp
Band	7p14.3	End	33,062,797 bp

Gene location (Mouse)
Chr.	Chromosome 6 (mouse)
Band	6|6 B3	Start	56,859,385 bp
Band	6|6 B3	End	56,900,917 bp
RNA expression pattern
Bgee	Human / Mouse (ortholog); Top expressed in: quadriceps femoris muscle; monocyte; thymus; rectum; duodenum; gastrocnemius muscle; muscle of thigh; islet of Langerhans; mucosa of transverse colon; cerebellar vermis / Top expressed in: blood; interventricular septum; islet of Langerhans; esophagus; right kidney; soleus muscle; left colon; spleen; temporal muscle; mucous cell of stomach; More reference expression data
BioGPS	n/a
Gene ontology
Molecular function	transferase activity; nucleotide binding; 5'-nucleotidase activity; hydrolase activity; magnesium ion binding; metal ion binding; tRNA 2'-phosphotransferase activity
Cellular component	cytoplasm; cytosol; endoplasmic reticulum
Biological process	pyrimidine nucleoside metabolic process; adenosine metabolic process; nucleotide metabolic process; pyrimidine nucleoside catabolic process; dephosphorylation
Sources:Amigo / QuickGO
Orthologs
Databases	NCBI: entry; OMA: entry
Species	Human	Mouse
Entrez	51251	107569
Ensembl	ENSG00000122643	ENSMUSG00000029780
UniProt	Q9H0P0	Q9D020
RefSeq (mRNA)	NM_001002009; NM_001002010; NM_001166118; NM_016489; NM_001356996	NM_001252374; NM_026004; NM_001360963
RefSeq (protein)	NP_001002009; NP_001002010; NP_001159590; NP_057573; NP_001343925 NP_001361264; NP_001361265; NP_001361266; NP_001361267; NP_001361268	NP_001239303; NP_080280; NP_001347892
Location (UCSC)	Chr 7: 33.01 – 33.06 Mb	Chr 6: 56.86 – 56.9 Mb
PubMed search
- Wikidata
View/Edit Human	View/Edit Mouse

Cytosolic 5'-nucleotidase 3A (NT5C3A) also known as pyrimidine 5’-nucleotidase (PN-I), or p56, is an enzyme that in humans is encoded by the NT5C3A gene (previously NT5C3).

This gene encodes a member of the 5'-nucleotidase family of enzymes that catalyze the dephosphorylation of nucleoside 5'-monophosphates. The encoded protein is the type 1 isozyme of pyrimidine 5' nucleotidase and catalyzes the dephosphorylation of pyrimidine 5' monophosphates. Mutations in this gene are a cause of hemolytic anemia due to uridine 5-prime monophosphate hydrolase deficiency. Alternatively spliced transcript variants encoding multiple isoforms have been observed for this gene, and pseudogenes of this gene are located on the long arm of chromosomes 3 and 4. [provided by RefSeq, Mar 2012]

== Structure ==
The NT5C3 gene consists of 10 exons and can be alternatively spliced at exon 2. Four possible isoforms have been identified, encoding proteins with lengths of 336 residues, 297 residues, 286 residues, and 285 residues. The 286-residue long isozyme is a monomeric protein containing 5 cysteine residues and no disulfide bridges or phosphate content. It has a predicted mass of 32.7 kDa and a predicted globular tertiary structure consisting of approximately 30% α-helices and 26% extended strands. This enzyme structurally resembles members of the haloacid dehalogenase (HAD) superfamily in regards to the shared α/β-Rossmann-like domain and a smaller 4-helix bundle domain. Three motifs in the α/β-Rossmann-like domain form the catalytic phosphate-binding site. Motif I is responsible for the 5′-nucleotidase activity: the first Asp makes a nucleophilic attack on the phosphate of the nucleoside monophosphate substrate, while the second Asp donates a proton to the leaving nucleoside. The active site is located in a cleft between the α/β-Rossmann-like domain and 4-helix bundle domain.

== Function ==
NT5C3 is a member of the 5'-nucleotidase family and one of the five cytosolic members identified in humans. NT5C3 catalyzes the dephosphorylation of the pyrimidine 5′ monophosphates UMP and CMP to the corresponding nucleosides. This function contributes to RNA degradation during the erythrocyte maturation process. As a result, NT5C3 regulates both the endogenous nucleoside and nucleotide pool balance, as well as that of pyrimidine analogs such as gemcitabine and AraC.

NT5C3 was first discovered in red blood cells, but its expression has been observed in multiple tumors (lung, ovary, colon, bladder), fetal tissues (lung, heart, spleen, liver), adult testis, and the brain. In particular, the 297-residue isoform of this enzyme is highly expressed in lymphoblastoid cells.

== Clinical significance ==
The loss of NT5C3 in pyrimidine 5' nucleotidase deficiency, an autosomal recessive condition, leads to the accumulation of high concentrations of pyrimidine nucleotides within erythrocytes. This deficiency is characterized by moderate hemolytic anemia, jaundice, splenomegaly, and marked basophilic stippling, and has been associated with learning difficulties. Two homozygous mutations identified in this gene produced large deletions that could cripple the enzyme’s structure and function, and are thus causally linked to pyrimidine 5' nucleotidase deficiency and hemolytic anemia. Heterozygous mutations in pyrimidine 5' nucleotidase deficiency may contribute to the large variability in thalassemia phenotypes. Pyrimidine 5' nucleotidase deficiency is also linked to the conversion of hemoglobin E disease into an unstable hemoglobinopathy-like disease. NT5C3 is identical to p36, a previously identified alpha-interferon-induced protein involved in forming lupus inclusions. Since NT5C3 can metabolize AraC, a nucleoside analog used in chemotherapy for acute myeloid leukemia patients, genotyping one of its polymorphisms may aid detection of patients who will respond favorably to this therapy.

== Interactions ==
NT5C3 is known to interact with pyrimidine nucleoside monophosphates, specifically UMP and CMP, as well as the anineoplastic agents 5’-AZTMP and 5’-Ara-CMP.
