= BTLA =

Protein-coding gene in the species Homo sapiens

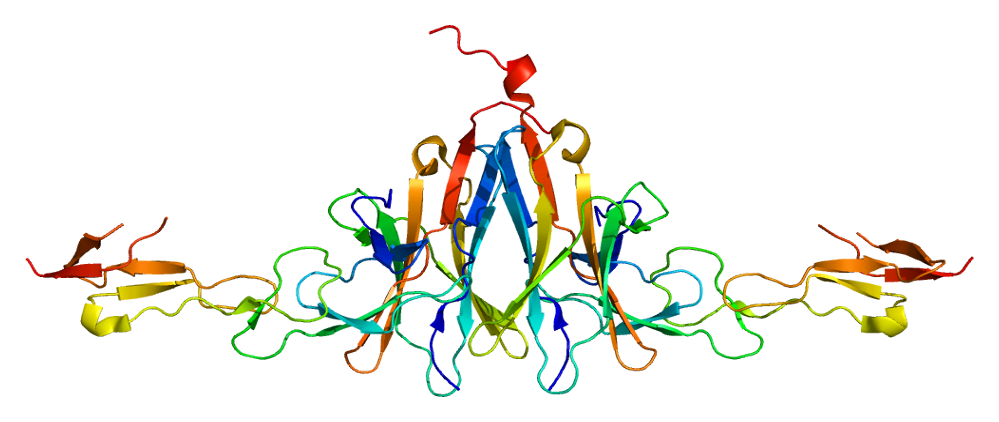

Identifiers
- Aliases: BTLA, BTLA1, CD272, B and T lymphocyte associated
- External IDs: OMIM: 607925; MGI: 2658978; GeneCards: BTLA
Available structures
PDB	Ortholog search: PDBe RCSB
PDB	List of PDB id codes 2AW2

Gene location (Human)
Chr.	Chromosome 3 (human)
Band	3q13.2	Start	112,463,966 bp
Band	3q13.2	End	112,499,472 bp

Gene location (Mouse)
Chr.	Chromosome 16 (mouse)
Band	16|16 B5	Start	45,044,678 bp
Band	16|16 B5	End	45,078,033 bp
RNA expression pattern
Bgee	Human / Mouse (ortholog); Top expressed in: lymph node; appendix; testicle; granulocyte; spleen; bone marrow cell; blood; mucosa of transverse colon; gonad; epithelium of colon / Top expressed in: mesenteric lymph nodes; spleen; blood; subcutaneous adipose tissue; submandibular gland; primitive streak; thymus; embryo; granulocyte; bone marrow; More reference expression data
BioGPS	n/a
Gene ontology
Molecular function	signaling receptor activity; protein binding
Cellular component	integral component of membrane; plasma membrane; membrane; integral component of plasma membrane
Biological process	T cell costimulation; adaptive immune response; immune system process; immune response-regulating cell surface receptor signaling pathway
Sources:Amigo / QuickGO
Orthologs
Databases	NCBI: entry; OMA: entry
Species	Human	Mouse
Entrez	151888	208154
Ensembl	ENSG00000186265	ENSMUSG00000052013
UniProt	Q7Z6A9	Q7TSA3
RefSeq (mRNA)	NM_001085357; NM_181780	NM_001037719; NM_177584
RefSeq (protein)	NP_001078826; NP_861445	NP_001032808; NP_808252
Location (UCSC)	Chr 3: 112.46 – 112.5 Mb	Chr 16: 45.04 – 45.08 Mb
PubMed search
- Wikidata
View/Edit Human	View/Edit Mouse

B- and T-lymphocyte attenuator or BTLA (also known as cluster of differentiation 272 or CD272) is a protein that belongs to the CD28 immunoglobulin superfamily (IgSF) which is encoded by the BTLA gene located on the 3rd human chromosome. BTLA was first discovered in 2003 as an inhibitor of Th1 expansion and it became the 3rd member of the CD28 IgSF. However, its discovered ligand herpes virus entry mediator or HVEM (also known as tumour necrosis factor receptor superfamily member 14 or TNFRSF14) belongs to the tumor necrosis factor receptor superfamily (TNFRSF). This finding was surprising because until the discovery of HVEM it was believed that receptors and ligands always belong to the same family.

== Expression ==
BTLA is broadly expressed in various organs. Among these are the lymph nodes, the thymus and the spleen where high expression of BTLA can be found. On the contrary, low to no expression is detected in organs such as the liver, kidney, heart, brain and other organs. If we consider specific cell populations then the expression of BTLA can be ascertained in T cell, B cells, DCs and NKT cells. In most of the aforementioned cells BTLA expression fluctuates depending on different developmental stages. For instance, in T cells, in which BTLA is most frequently studied, BTLA is stably expressed in naive T cells, the expression subsequently increases when a T cell is stimulated, but once fully activated the expression of BTLA again decreases.

== Structure ==
BTLA is a 289 amino acid long transmembrane glycoprotein. It is very similar in structure to PD-1 and CTLA-4. Therefore, it consists of an extracellular domain, a transmembrane domain and a cytoplasmic domain. The cytoplasmatic domain is indispensable for signalling and it is constituted of 3 important motives: the growth factor receptor-bound protein-2 (Grb-2) recognition motif, the immunoreceptor tyrosine-based inhibitory motif (ITIM) and the immunoreceptor tyrosine-based switch motif (ITSM).

== Function ==
Considering the above-mentioned motives in the cytoplasmatic part of BTLA, it is obvious that BTLA has inhibition and activation capacities. The reason is that through ITIM it recruits either SHP-1 or SHP-2 which act as phosphatases and dephosphorylate tyrosine which suppresses immune activation. On the other hand, it also possesses the Grb-2 recognition motif which, when recognized by a Grb-2 protein, promotes activation of PI3K and that further mediates cell proliferation and survival.

As stated above, HVEM is the main ligand of BTLA but unlike BTLA, HVEM is able to interact with other molecules as well namely CD160 and tumor necrosis factor superfamily member 14 (TNFSF14) also known as LIGHT. Interaction of HVEM and CD160 is inhibitory but interaction with LIGHT is stimulatory. Therefore, HVEM can also induce both stimulation and inhibition. Taken together, it seems that the molecules CD160, BTLA, LIGHT and HVEM form a kind of regulatory network.

=== T cell ===
Both BTLA and HVEM are expressed on naive T cells. This colocalization on a single cell allows them to interact in a cis manner (on the same cell). This interaction is important in immunological tolerance as shown by the fact that BTLA mouse knockdown is unable to develop tolerance to high doses of ovalbumin. Furthermore, the knockdown also proves that BTLA is dispensable for T cell development as no abnormalities were detected in T cells development.

When a T cell is fully activated HVEM is internalized and this allows BTLA to interact in a trans manner (with molecules on other cells). This enables other cells who express HVEM to regulate activated T cells. Treg cells express HVEM and are able to facilitate immune suppression through interaction with BTLA. Furthermore, the blockage of BTLA together with PD-1 can help reverting the state of exhaustion which further proves the importance of BTLA as an inhibitory molecule. However, in some cases interaction of BTLA and HVEM can have an opposite effect. For instance, in the case of infection with vaccinia virus BTLA and HVEM interaction promotes survival of CD8+ T cells and production of memory cells.

=== B cell ===
B cell's expression of BTLA is less studied than T cell's but it is clear that peripheral B cells express a high amount of BTLA whereas in bone marrow B cell precursors express a lower amount of BTLA. BTLA has been connected with suppressory function in B cells and its expression is not necessary for B cell development just like in T cells. However, a lower expression of BTLA on B cells in elderly is implied in a less potent response to the influenza vaccine.

=== DC ===
BTLA can also be found on DCs, with mature DCs having a higher expression of BTLA and immature DCs a lower one. Just like in T cells and B cells, most results show that BTLA and HVEM interaction suppresses the maturation of DCs.

== Clinical significance ==
=== Tumors ===
In many cases BTLA expression is connected with unfavourable outcomes as it, for instance, inhibits the function of human CD8+ cancer-specific T cells. For example, this is the case of gallbladder cancer where BTLA+ CD8+ T cells are associated with inhibition of anticancer immunity. Similarly, BTLA+ CD8+ T cells show partial dysfunctionality and decrease secretion of IFN-γ in melanoma patients. Therefore, it seems that BTLA can be used as a novel antitumor therapy target. This notion is supported by the fact that in patients with hepatocarcinoma blocking of BTLA signalling increases the secretion of IFN-γ by CD8+ and CD4+ T cells. However, some studies have shown that, for instance, colorectal carcinoma is associated with lower BTLA expression and that the lower BTLA expression is connected with poor survival. Even in some cases of melanoma BTLA+ CD8+ lymphocytes are suggested to be connected with better outcomes of adoptive cell therapy. Hence, it seems that BTLA has rather a context-specific function. This fact should be taken into account if BTLA is to be used as a cancer therapy target.

=== Infectious diseases ===
As in the case of tumors, BTLA seems to be mainly an inhibitory molecule as, for instance, in the case of pulmonary tuberculosis where BTLA expression in CD4+ and CD8+ T cells is connected with the disease progression. Similar results can be seen during helminth infections. When mice are infected by Strongyloides ratti the mice with BTLA knockdown are faster at eliminating the parasite from the intestine probably through the production of IL-9. Furthermore, the course of virus infections seems to be negatively affected by BTLA as well. During chronic hepatitis B infection BTLA impairs T cell response and what's more blocking BTLA leads to T cell proliferation and higher cytokine production. However, as already mentioned in some cases BTLA seems to have a stimulatory role. This is the case of the aforementioned pulmonary tuberculosis where BTLA+ αβ T cells are predominantly of central memory phenotype and fight off Mycobacterium tuberculosis. A further example is an infection with vaccinia virus during which deletion of BTLA or HVEM causes instability and early apoptosis of CD8+ T cells.
