= Stari Trg, Trebnje =

Stari Trg
- Location in Slovenia
- Coordinates: 45°54′27″N 15°01′06″E
- Country: Slovenia
- Traditional region: Lower Carniola
- Statistical region: Southeast Slovenia
- Municipality: Trebnje
- Elevation: 276 m (906 ft)

Stari Trg (pronounced [ˈstaːɾi ˈtəɾk]; Slovene: Stari trg, German: Altenmarkt)) is a former village in eastern Slovenia in the Municipality of Trebnje. It is now part of the town of Trebnje. It is part of the traditional region of Lower Carniola and is now included in the Southeast Slovenia Statistical Region.

== Geography ==
Stari Trg stands east of the center of Trebnje on the edge of the flood plain of the Temenica River. There are tilled fields to the north on a gently rising slope, and swampy meadows mostly lie to the south near the river.

== Name ==
The name Stari trg means 'old market town' and is relatively common in Slovenia. Stari Trg is in fact the oldest settlement in the Temenica Valley, and its role as the central settlement in the area was only later taken over by Trebnje.

== History ==
A Roman road passed through Stari Trg, and archaeological finds have included the remains of Roman walls, graves, and stones with inscriptions. Stari Trg was annexed by Trebnje in 1972, ending its existence as a separate settlement.

== Notable people ==
Notable people that were born or lived in Stari Trg include:

- Ema Peče (1873–1965), teacher, editor
