= OSCAR (gene) =

Protein-coding gene in the species Homo sapiens

Identifiers
- Aliases: OSCAR, PIGR3, PIgR-3, osteoclast associated, immunoglobulin-like receptor, osteoclast associated Ig-like receptor
- External IDs: OMIM: 606862; MGI: 2179720; GeneCards: OSCAR
Available structures
PDB	Ortholog search: PDBe RCSB
PDB	List of PDB id codes 5EIV, 5EIQ, 5CJB, 5CJ8

Gene location (Human)
Chr.	Chromosome 19 (human)
Band	19q13.42	Start	54,094,668 bp
Band	19q13.42	End	54,102,692 bp

Gene location (Mouse)
Chr.	Chromosome 7 (mouse)
Band	7|7 A1	Start	3,612,812 bp
Band	7|7 A1	End	3,619,156 bp
RNA expression pattern
Bgee	Human / Mouse (ortholog); Top expressed in: monocyte; blood; granulocyte; spleen; upper lobe of left lung; right lung; bone marrow; bone marrow cell; gonad; appendix / Top expressed in: morula; embryo; embryo; body of femur; spermatocyte; superior frontal gyrus; primary visual cortex; secondary oocyte; neural layer of retina; cerebellar cortex; More reference expression data
BioGPS	n/a
Gene ontology
Molecular function	collagen receptor activity
Cellular component	integral component of membrane; extracellular region; plasma membrane; extracellular exosome; membrane; specific granule lumen; tertiary granule lumen
Biological process	regulation of immune response; neutrophil degranulation; osteoclast differentiation; collagen-activated signaling pathway
Sources:Amigo / QuickGO
Orthologs
Databases	NCBI: entry; OMA: entry
Species	Human	Mouse
Entrez	126014	232790
Ensembl	ENSG00000277088; ENSG00000170909; ENSG00000274703; ENSG00000276982; ENSG00000278533 ENSG00000275736; ENSG00000275551; ENSG00000278378; ENSG00000273511; ENSG00000275644	ENSMUSG00000054594
UniProt	Q8IYS5	Q8VBT3
RefSeq (mRNA)	NM_001282349; NM_001282350; NM_130771; NM_133168; NM_133169 NM_206817; NM_206818	NM_001290377; NM_175632
RefSeq (protein)	NP_001269278; NP_001269279; NP_570127; NP_573398; NP_573399 NP_996554	NP_001277306; NP_783440
Location (UCSC)	Chr 19: 54.09 – 54.1 Mb	Chr 7: 3.61 – 3.62 Mb
PubMed search
- Wikidata
View/Edit Human	View/Edit Mouse

Osteoclast-associated immunoglobulin-like receptor is a protein that in humans is encoded by the OSCAR gene.

Osteoclasts are multinucleated cells that resorb bone and are essential for bone homeostasis. This gene encodes an osteoclast-associated receptor (OSCAR), which is a member of the leukocyte receptor complex (LRC) protein family that plays critical roles in the regulation of both innate and adaptive immune responses. Different from the other LRC members, OSCAR expression is detected specifically in preosteoclasts or mature osteoclasts. OSCAR may be an important bone-specific regulator of osteoclast differentiation. Multiple alternatively spliced transcript variants encoding different isoforms have been found for this gene.
