= DTDP-3-amino-3,6-dideoxy-alpha-D-glucopyranose transaminase =

Class of enzymes

Identifiers
- EC no.: 2.6.1.89

Databases
- IntEnz: IntEnz view
- BRENDA: BRENDA entry
- ExPASy: NiceZyme view
- KEGG: KEGG entry
- MetaCyc: metabolic pathway
- PRIAM: profile
- PDB structures: RCSB PDB PDBe PDBsum
Search
- PMC: articles
- PubMed: articles
- NCBI: proteins

DTDP-3-amino-3,6-dideoxy-alpha-D-glucopyranose transaminase (EC 2.6.1.89, TylB, TDP-3-keto-6-deoxy-D-glucose 3-aminotransferase, TDP-3-dehydro-6-deoxy-D-glucose 3-aminotransferase, dTDP-3-keto-6-deoxy-D-glucose 3-aminotransferase, dTDP-3-dehydro-6-deoxy-D-glucose 3-aminotransferase) is an enzyme with systematic name dTDP-3-amino-3,6-dideoxy-alpha-D-glucopyranose:2-oxoglutarate aminotransferase. This enzyme catalyses the following chemical reaction

dTDP-3-amino-3,6-dideoxy-alpha-D-glucopyranose + 2-oxoglutarate $\rightleftharpoons$ dTDP-3-dehydro-6-deoxy-alpha-D-glucopyranose + L-glutamate

This enzyme is a pyridoxal-phosphate protein.
