= FEZF1 =

Protein-coding gene in the species Homo sapiens

Identifiers
- Aliases: FEZF1, FEZ, ZNF312B, HH22, FEZ family zinc finger 1
- External IDs: OMIM: 613301; MGI: 1920441; GeneCards: FEZF1

Gene location (Human)
Chr.	Chromosome 7 (human)
Band	7q31.32	Start	122,301,303 bp
Band	7q31.32	End	122,310,691 bp

Gene location (Mouse)
Chr.	Chromosome 6 (mouse)
Band	6|6 A3.1	Start	23,245,043 bp
Band	6|6 A3.1	End	23,248,361 bp
RNA expression pattern
Bgee	Human / Mouse (ortholog); Top expressed in: testicle; hypothalamus; caudate nucleus; amygdala; olfactory zone of nasal mucosa; putamen; left testis; nucleus accumbens; gonad; right testis / Top expressed in: external naris; ventromedial nucleus; respiratory epithelium; olfactory epithelium; Jacobson's organ; lumbar spinal ganglion; zygote; suprachiasmatic nucleus; mesencephalon; lateral hypothalamus; More reference expression data
BioGPS	n/a
Gene ontology
Molecular function	DNA binding; metal ion binding; RNA polymerase II cis-regulatory region sequence-specific DNA binding; nucleic acid binding; DNA-binding transcription repressor activity, RNA polymerase II-specific; sequence-specific DNA binding; DNA-binding transcription factor activity, RNA polymerase II-specific
Cellular component	nucleus; cytosol
Biological process	forebrain anterior/posterior pattern specification; cell differentiation; regulation of transcription, DNA-templated; neuron migration; negative regulation of transcription by RNA polymerase II; transcription, DNA-templated; nervous system development; positive regulation of transcription, DNA-templated; multicellular organism development; telencephalon development; positive regulation of neuron differentiation; forebrain development; olfactory bulb development; negative regulation of cell population proliferation; axon guidance; cell dedifferentiation; regulation of neurogenesis
Sources:Amigo / QuickGO
Orthologs
Databases	NCBI: entry; OMA: entry
Species	Human	Mouse
Entrez	389549	73191
Ensembl	ENSG00000128610	ENSMUSG00000029697
UniProt	A0PJY2	Q0VDQ9
RefSeq (mRNA)	NM_001024613; NM_001160264	NM_028462
RefSeq (protein)	NP_001019784; NP_001153736	NP_082738
Location (UCSC)	Chr 7: 122.3 – 122.31 Mb	Chr 6: 23.25 – 23.25 Mb
PubMed search
- Wikidata
View/Edit Human	View/Edit Mouse

FEZ family zinc finger 1 is a protein that in humans is encoded by the FEZF1 gene.

== Clinical significance ==
FEZF1 is a gene that encodes for transcriptional repressors, and it has been shown to repress the transcription factor HES5. In the mouse, FEZF1 is expressed in the forebrain in early development of the embryo. This suppression of HES5 helps to control the differentiation of neural stem cells. FEZF1 also helps to divide the caudal forebrain into three distinct parts during development: the prethalamus, the thalamus, and the pretectum. Mice lacking FEZF1 had no prethalamus and had a smaller thalamus. A loss of function mutation in FEZF1 causes Kallmann Syndrome. As axons are developing and migrating in the early embryo, FEZF1 allows the axons of olfactory neurons to attach to the central nervous system in the mice model. During neural development, GnRH neurons migrate through one of these olfactory axon pathways, and the loss of function of FEZF1 therefore results in the loss of GnRH neurons in the brain, the hallmark of Kallmann Syndrome.
