= TRG (gene) =

Protein-coding gene in the species Homo sapiens

Identifiers
- Aliases: TRG, TCRG, TRG@, T cell receptor gamma locus, T-cell receptor gamma locus
- External IDs: GeneCards: TRG; OMA:TRG - orthologs
Orthologs
Species	Human	Mouse
Entrez	6965	n/a
Ensembl	n/a	n/a
UniProt	n a	n/a
RefSeq (mRNA)	n/a	n/a
RefSeq (protein)	n/a	n/a
Location (UCSC)	n/a	n/a
PubMed search		n/a
- Wikidata
View/Edit Human

T cell receptor gamma locus is a protein that in humans is encoded by the TRG gene, also known as TCRG or TRG@. It contributes the gamma (γ) chain to the larger TCR protein (T-cell receptor).

== Function ==
T cell receptors recognize foreign antigens which have been processed as small peptides and bound to major histocompatibility complex (MHC) molecules at the surface of antigen presenting cells (APC) (APC). Each T cell receptor is a dimer consisting of one alpha and one beta chain or one delta and one gamma chain. In a single cell, the T cell receptor loci are rearranged and expressed in the order delta, gamma, beta, and alpha. If both delta and gamma rearrangements produce functional chains, the cell expresses delta and gamma. If not, the cell proceeds to rearrange the beta and alpha loci. This region represents the germline organization of the T cell receptor gamma locus. The gamma locus includes V (variable), J (joining), and C (constant) segments. During T cell development, the gamma chain is synthesized by a recombination event at the DNA level joining a V segment with a J segment; the C segment is later joined by splicing at the RNA level. Recombination of many different V segments with several J segments provides a wide range of antigen recognition. Additional diversity is attained by junctional diversity, resulting from the random addition of nucleotides by terminal deoxynucleotidyl transferase. Several V segments of the gamma locus are known to be incapable of encoding a protein and are considered pseudogenes. Somatic rearrangement of the gamma locus has been observed in T cells derived from patients with T cell leukemia and ataxia telangiectasia.

== Structure ==
In the αβ T cell lineage, these chains are disulfide-linked and noncovalently associated at the cell surface of T lymphocytes. While the αβ lineage has been widely studied, the γδ lineage has not due to the minimal number of defined antigens, the unusual cellular responses to their environment, and the resulting challenge of identifying and studying this population in vivo. Recombinant technology has allowed for the identification of the T-cell receptor gamma (TRG) gene that is found associated with the CD3 complex on the cell surface. As early as 1988, the structure and genetic basis of the γδ TCR was reported. The γ and δ chains can be either disulfide-linked or noncovalently attached.

The genomic sequence of the TRG locus has been determined in Canis lupus familiaris, with the Carnivora order hypothesized as the putative origin of the TRG locus. Forty genes were discovered of the following three types: variable (TRGV), joining (TRGJ), and constant (TRGC). These genes are organized into eight cassettes aligned with the same transcriptional orientation. Each cassette is composed of a V-J-J-C unit, except one with a J-J-C unit on the 3’ end of the locus. The canine locus is approximately 460 kb in length. Eight of the sixteen total TRGV genes, seven of the sixteen TRGJ genes, and six of the eight TRGC genes were determined to be functional. The locus organization of the TRG chain has been found to vary greatly across species and can be traced back evolutionarily. The human TRG locus is located on chromosome 7 and includes 14 variable segments, of which eight are potentially active, five joining segments, and two constant segments.

== Function ==
T cells expressing the γ-chain (TRG+ cells) make up 3-10% of normal adult peripheral blood lymphocytes, with the majority (>80%) being of the Vγ2Vδ2+ subtype (referred to as Vδ2+ T cells). All TRG+ cells also express CD3, CD4, and CD8 complexes. While CD3 complexes have been associated with cytolytic regulation, it is unclear whether TRG is also necessary for mediated cellular cytotoxicity.

The function of the γ chain as well as the γδ dimer is still largely unknown, although they have been implicated in cytokine secretion and cytotoxic activity as a part of the protective immune system. The Vδ2+ T cells recognize small non-peptide antigens, but unlike αβ T cells, these antigens do not need to be processed by antigen-presenting cells or presented by classical major histocompatibility complex (MHC) molecules. This expansion in response to infections is specific to and more efficient in γδ T cells than αβ cells. There is a hypothesis that γδ T cells process these pathogenic antigens, transport them to draining lymph nodes, and then present the antigens to activate αβ T cells and other immune effectors. These Vδ2+ T cells have been reported to connect the innate and adaptive immune systems. Their innate effector functions include cell lysis and secretion of chemokines and cytokines, while their adaptive immunity functions include B cell help, DC maturation, and provision of memory T cells. Once activated these Vδ2+ T cells potentially mimic professional APCs by processing and presenting antigens. After activation, these cells may upregulate several antigen-presentation, adhesion, and co-stimulation molecules that mimic dendritic cells, a particular type of APC. These Vδ2+ T cells are exclusive to higher primates, indicating that they are responsible for protection against species-specific microbes.

== Clinical significance ==
Deletions and mutations of the TRG gene have been implicated in a variety of cancers. Specifically, γδ T cells may contribute to the immune response against several tumor types (lymphoma, myeloma, breast, colon, lung, ovary, and others). They act directly through mediation of cytotoxic activity and indirectly through the regulation of other cell types responsible for the anti-tumor response. The presence of γδ T cells in the tumor microenvironment has been associated with poor prognosis in some cancers. This has led to the suggestion that these cells have plasticity and can respond to environmental cues. A potential mechanism is the downregulation of dendritic cell maturation, leading to immunosuppression. While γδ T cells have been implicated in T cell lymphomas, there is also a specific subtype known as γδ T-cell lymphoma, characterized by the proliferation of those cells exclusively. This lymphoma can be quite aggressive with ulcerative plaques and subcutaneous nodules. In adenocarcinoma, polyclonal rearrangement of the TCR γ chain gene was significantly greater in N1 and N2 patients (using the TNM cancer staging system) than in N0 patients. Apart from carcinomas, TRG has also been correlated with hepatitis B virus (HBV). Specifically, Vδ2+ T cell levels and TCR γδ T cell cytotoxicity were significantly lower in patients with chronic HBV infections. These T cells may also play a role in immune cell reconstitution after hematopoietic stem cell transplantation, a procedure often used for cancers of the blood or bone marrow. The probability of post-procedure infections was significantly lower in patients with elevated levels of γδ T cells.
