= Steven Marsh (geneticist) =

British Immunogeneticist

Professor Steven G. E. Marsh FRCPath

Professor of Immunogenetics, University College London

Personal details
- Born: Steven G. E. Marsh

Steven G. E. Marsh is a British Immunogeneticist and leader in the field of histocompatibility and immunogenetics having published more than 400 scientific papers on the subject. Marsh is Professor of Immunogenetics within University College London. He was previously the Chief Bioinformatics and Immunogenetics Officer at the charity Anthony Nolan where he headed the HLA Informatics Group .

Marsh has made contributions to standardization of human leukocyte antigen nomenclature as Chair of the World Health Organization's Nomenclature Committee for Factors of the HLA System.

== Publications ==
- The HLA FactsBook [Paperback] ISBN 0-12-545025-7 | ISBN 978-0-12-545025-6 | Publication Date: January 5, 2000
