= Pidilizumab =

Monoclonal antibody

Monoclonal antibody
- Type: Whole antibody
- Source: Humanized (from mouse)
- Target: DLL1

Clinical data
- ATC code: none

Identifiers
- CAS Number: 1036730-42-3
- ChemSpider: none
- UNII: B932PAQ1BQ
- KEGG: D10390

Chemical and physical data
- Formula: C_{6424}H_{9920}N_{1704}O_{2002}S_{48}
- Molar mass: 144594.83 g·mol^{−1}

Pidilizumab (formerly CT-011) is a monoclonal antibody being developed by Medivation for the treatment of cancer and infectious diseases. Pidilizumab was originally thought to bind to the PD-1 immune checkpoint molecule, however, recent evidence suggests that Delta-like 1 (DLL1) is its primary binding target while binding to PD-1 is secondary and restricted to non-glycosylated and hypoglycosylated forms of this molecule. Pidilizumab causes in the attenuation of apoptotic processes in lymphocytes, primarily effector/memory T cells.

== Clinical trials ==
It had encouraging results by 2011 from phase II clinical trials for diffuse large B-cell lymphoma. A phase II open-label study in combination for relapsed follicular lymphoma found good results compared to usual response rates. A phase I/II open label study in pediatric patients with a rare form of brain cancer, diffuse intrinsic pontine glioma, found improvement in overall survival compared to expected outcome. An add-on trial for multiple myeloma is ongoing.
