= Temporal lobe necrosis =

Rare brain disease

Temporal lobe necrosis is a late-stage and serious complication usually occurring in persons who have undergone radiation treatment for nasopharyngeal carcinoma (NPC). It is rather rare and occurs in 4-30% of patients who receive radiation treatment for NPC. Many patients who experience temporal lobe necrosis are asymptomatic. This demonstrates a need for consistent imaging follow up, such as MRI and/or PET/CT, to help with the potential management of it. Those who are symptomatic usually experience "vague" symptoms including headaches, dizziness, intracranial pressure, personality changes, seizures, and short-term memory loss. The rarity of this disease has led to difficulty in finding optimal treatments, however, most treatments include one or some of the following: steroids such as decadron, hyperbaric oxygen, and surgery.
