= Toripalimab =

Medication

Monoclonal antibody
- Type: Whole antibody
- Source: Humanized
- Target: PD-1

Clinical data
- Trade names: Loqtorzi
- Other names: Toripalimab-tpzi
- AHFS/Drugs.com: Monograph
- MedlinePlus: a624004
- License data: US DailyMed: Toripalimab
- Routes of administration: Intravenous
- Drug class: Antineoplastic
- ATC code: L01FF13 (WHO)

Legal status
- Legal status: AU: S4 (Prescription only); CA: ℞-only; US: ℞-only; EU: Rx-only; In general: ℞ (Prescription only)

Identifiers
- CAS Number: 1924598-82-2
- DrugBank: DB15043
- UNII: 8JXN261VVA
- KEGG: D12202

Chemical and physical data
- Formula: C_{6548}H_{10104}N_{1728}O_{2054}S_{44}
- Molar mass: 147309.54 g·mol^{−1}

Toripalimab, sold under the brand name Loqtorzi, is a monoclonal antibody used for the treatment of melanoma and nasopharyngeal carcinoma. Toripalimab is a recombinant humanized programmed cell death protein 1 (PD-1) monoclonal antibody that acts as a checkpoint inhibitor.

In 2018, toripalimab was approved in China for the treatment of unresectable or metastatic melanoma that has failed previous systemic therapy. In October 2023, the US Food and Drug Administration (FDA) approved toripalimab for the first-line treatment of adults with metastatic or recurrent, locally advanced nasopharyngeal carcinoma when used with cisplatin and gemcitabine.

== Medical uses ==
Toripalimab is indicated in combination with cisplatin and gemcitabine for the first-line treatment of adults with metastatic or recurrent locally advanced nasopharyngeal carcinoma. It is also indicated as a single agent for adults with recurrent unresectable or metastatic nasopharyngeal carcinoma with disease progression on or after a platinum-containing chemotherapy.

== History ==
Efficacy of toripalimab with cisplatin and gemcitabine was evaluated in JUPITER-02 (NCT03581786), a randomized, multicenter, single region, double-blind, placebo-controlled trial in 289 participants with metastatic or recurrent, locally advanced nasopharyngeal carcinoma who had not received previous systemic chemotherapy for recurrent or metastatic disease. Participants were randomized (1:1) to either toripalimab with cisplatin and gemcitabine, followed by toripalimab, or placebo with cisplatin and gemcitabine, followed by placebo.

Efficacy of toripalimab as a single agent was evaluated in POLARIS-02 (NCT02915432), an open-label, multicenter, single country, multicohort trial in 172 participants with unresectable or metastatic nasopharyngeal carcinoma who had received prior platinum-based chemotherapy or had disease progression within six months of completion of platinum-based chemotherapy administered as neoadjuvant, adjuvant, or definitive chemoradiation treatment for locally advanced disease. Participants received toripalimab until disease progression per RECIST v1.1 or unacceptable toxicity.

The FDA granted the application for toripalimab priority review, breakthrough therapy, and orphan drug designations.

== Society and culture ==
=== Legal status ===
In July 2024, the Committee for Medicinal Products for Human Use of the European Medicines Agency adopted a positive opinion, recommending the granting of a marketing authorization for the medicinal product Loqtorzi, intended for the treatment of nasopharyngeal carcinoma and esophageal squamous cell carcinoma. The applicant for this medicinal product is TMC Pharma (EU) Limited. Loqtorzi was authorized for medical use in the European Union in September 2024.
