= Immune checkpoint =

Regulators of the immune system

Immune checkpoints in the tumour microenvironment

Immune checkpoints of immunosuppressive actions associated with breast cancer

Immune checkpoints are regulators of the immune system. These pathways are crucial for self-tolerance, which prevents the immune system from attacking cells indiscriminately. However, some cancers can protect themselves from attack by stimulating immune checkpoint targets.

Inhibitory checkpoint molecules are targets for cancer immunotherapy due to their potential for use in multiple types of cancers. Currently approved checkpoint inhibitors block CTLA4, PD-1 and PD-L1. For the related basic science discoveries, James P. Allison and Tasuku Honjo won the Tang Prize in Biopharmaceutical Science and the Nobel Prize in Physiology or Medicine in 2018.

== Stimulatory checkpoint molecules ==
Four stimulatory checkpoint molecules are members of the tumor necrosis factor (TNF) receptor superfamily—CD27, CD40, OX40, GITR and CD137. Another two stimulatory checkpoint molecules belong to the B7-CD28 superfamily—CD28 itself and ICOS.

- CD27: This molecule supports antigen-specific expansion of naïve T cells and is vital for the generation of T cell memory. CD27 is also a memory marker of B cells. CD27's activity is governed by the transient availability of its ligand, CD70, on lymphocytes and dendritic cells. CD27 costimulation is known to suppress Th17 effector cell function. The American biotech company Celldex Therapeutics is working on CDX-1127, an agonistic anti-CD27 monoclonal antibody which in animal models has been shown to be effective in the context of T cell receptor stimulation.
- CD28: This molecule is constitutively expressed on almost all human CD4+ T cells and on around half of all CD8 T cells. Binding with its two ligands are CD80 and CD86, expressed on dendritic cells, prompts T cell expansion. CD28 was the target of the TGN1412 'superagonist' which caused severe inflammatory reactions in the first-in-man study in London in March 2006.
- CD40: This molecule, found on a variety of immune system cells including antigen presenting cells has CD40L, otherwise known as CD154 and transiently expressed on the surface of activated CD4+ T cells, as its ligand. CD40 signaling is known to 'license' dendritic cells to mature and thereby trigger T-cell activation and differentiation. A now-defunct Seattle-based biotechnology company called VLST in-licensed an anti-CD40 agonist monoclonal antibody from Pfizer in 2012. The Swiss pharmaceutical company Roche acquired this project when VLST was shut down in 2013.
- CD122: This molecule, which is the Interleukin-2 receptor beta sub-unit, is known to increase proliferation of CD8+ effector T cells. The American biotechnology company Nektar Therapeutics is working on NKTR-214, a CD122-biased immune-stimulatory cytokine Phase I results announced in Nov 2016.
- CD137: When this molecule, also called 4-1BB, is bound by CD137 ligand, the result is T-cell proliferation. CD137-mediated signaling is also known to protect T cells, and in particular, CD8+ T cells from activation-induced cell death. The German biotech company Pieris Pharmaceuticals has developed an engineered lipocalin that is bi-specific for CD137 and HER2.
- OX40: This molecule, also called CD134, has OX40L, or CD252, as its ligand. Like CD27, OX40 promotes the expansion of effector and memory T cells, however it is also noted for its ability to suppress the differentiation and activity of T-regulatory cells, and also for its regulation of cytokine production. OX40's value as a drug target primarily lies in the fact that, being transiently expressed after T-cell receptor engagement, it is only upregulated on the most recently antigen-activated T cells within inflammatory lesions. Anti-OX40 monoclonal antibodies have been shown to have clinical utility in advanced cancer. The pharma company AstraZeneca has three drugs in development targeting OX40: MEDI0562 is a humanised OX40 agonist; MEDI6469, murine OX4 agonist; and MEDI6383, an OX40 agonist
- GITR: short for Glucocorticoid-Induced TNFR family Related gene, prompts T cell expansion, including Treg expansion. The ligand for GITR is mainly expressed on antigen presenting cells. Antibodies to GITR have been shown to promote an anti-tumor response through loss of Treg lineage stability. The biotech company TG Therapeutics is working on anti-GITR antibodies
- ICOS: This molecule, short for Inducible T-cell costimulator, and also called CD278, is expressed on activated T cells. Its ligand is ICOSL, expressed mainly on B cells and dendritic cells. The molecule seems to be important in T cell effector function. The American biotechnology company Jounce Therapeutics is developing an ICOS agonist.

== Inhibitory checkpoint molecules ==
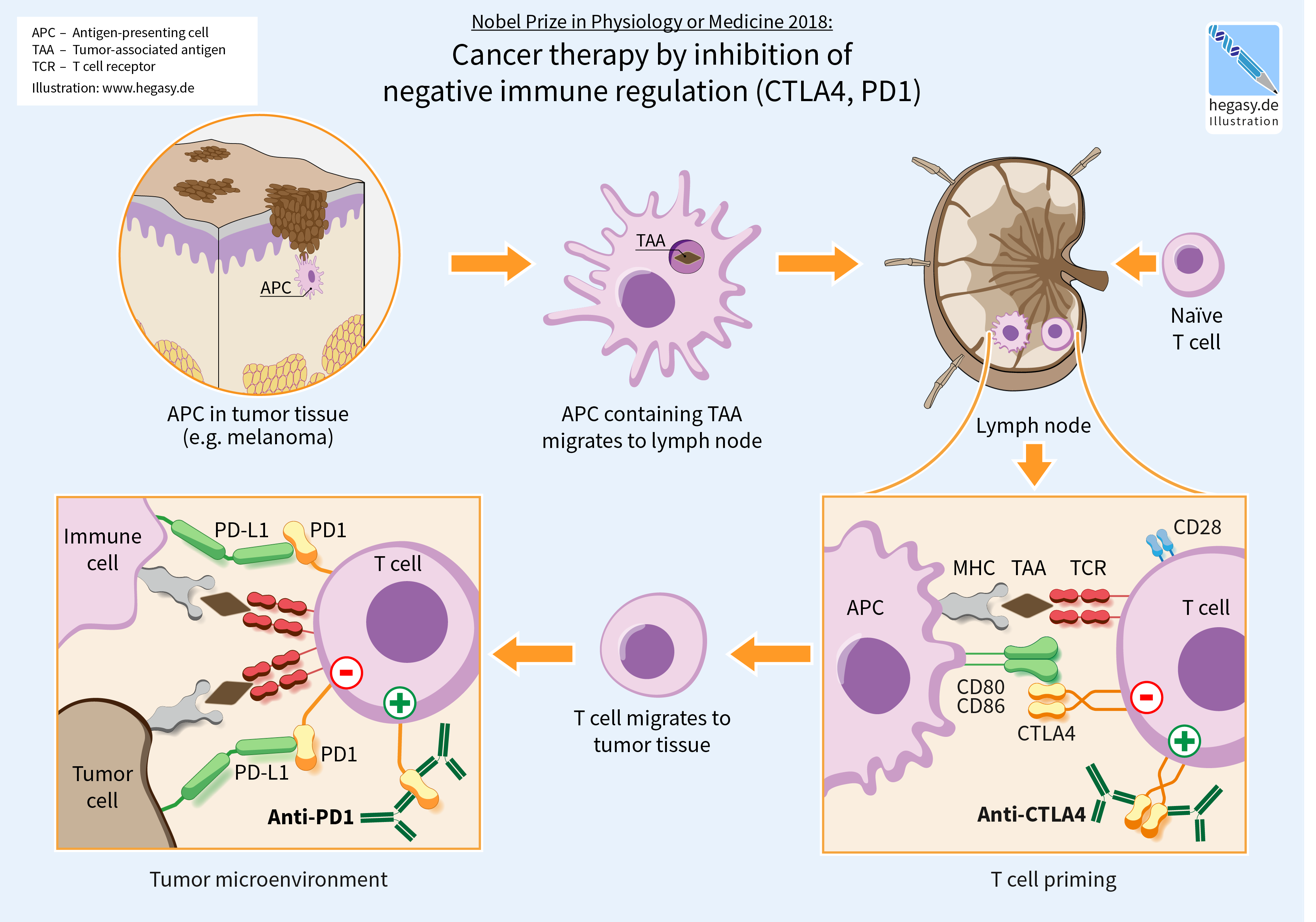
Cancer Therapy by Inhibition of Negative Immune Regulation (CTLA4, PD1)

- A2AR & A2BR: The Adenosine A2A receptor is regarded as an important checkpoint in cancer therapy because adenosine in the immune microenvironment, leading to the activation of the A2a receptor, is negative immune feedback loop and the tumor microenvironment has relatively high concentrations of adenosine. Recently, the role of the A2B receptor in the immune system has been demonstrated. Studies propose that in tissues where they are co-expressed, A2A and A2B form dimers under the majority control of the A2B receptor.
- B7-H3: also called CD276, was originally understood to be a co-stimulatory molecule but is now regarded as co-inhibitory. The American biotechnology company MacroGenics is working on MGA271 is an Fc-optimized monoclonal antibody that targets B7-H3. B7-H3's receptors have not yet been identified.
- B7-H4: also called VTCN1, is expressed by tumor cells and tumor-associated macrophages and plays a role in tumour escape.
- BTLA: This molecule, short for B and T Lymphocyte Attenuator and also called CD272, has Herpesvirus entry mediator as its ligand. Surface expression of BTLA is gradually downregulated during differentiation of human CD8+ T cells from the naive to effector cell phenotype, however tumor-specific human CD8+ T cells express high levels of BTLA.
- CTLA-4: short for Cytotoxic T-Lymphocyte-Associated protein 4 and also called CD152, is the target of Bristol-Myers Squibb's melanoma drug Yervoy, which gained FDA approval in March 2011. Expression of CTLA-4 on Treg cells serves to control T cell proliferation.
- IDO: short for Indoleamine 2,3-dioxygenase, is a tryptophan catabolic enzyme with immune-inhibitory properties. Another important molecule is TDO, tryptophan 2,3-dioxygenase. IDO is known to suppress T and NK cells, generate and activate Tregs and myeloid-derived suppressor cells, and promote tumour angiogenesis.
- KIR: short for Killer-cell Immunoglobulin-like Receptor, is a receptor for MHC Class I molecules on Natural Killer cells. Bristol-Myers Squibb is working on Lirilumab, a monoclonal antibody to KIR.
- LAG3: short for Lymphocyte Activation Gene-3, works to suppress an immune response by action to Tregs as well as direct effects on CD8+ T cells. Bristol-Myers Squibb is in Phase I with an anti-LAG3 monoclonal antibody called BMS-986016.
- NOX2: short for nicotinamide adenine dinucleotide phosphate NADPH oxidase isoform 2, is an enzyme of myeloid cells that generates immunosuppressive reactive oxygen species. Genetic and pharmacological inhibition of NOX2 in myeloid cells improves anti-tumor functions of adjacent NK cells and T cells and also triggers autoimmunity in humans and experimental animals. NOX2 is the target of Ceplene that has gained approval for use in acute myeloid leukemia within the EU.
- PD-1: short for Programmed Death 1 (PD-1) receptor, has two ligands, PD-L1 and PD-L2. This checkpoint is the target of Merck & Co.'s melanoma drug Keytruda, which gained FDA approval in September 2014. The checkpoint is also the target of EMD Serono (Merck KGaA)'s drug Bavencio, which gained FDA approval in 2017. An advantage of targeting PD-1 is that it can restore immune function in the tumor microenvironment.
- TIM-3: short for T-cell Immunoglobulin domain and Mucin domain 3, expresses on activated human CD4+ T cells and regulates Th1 and Th17 cytokines. TIM-3 acts as a negative regulator of Th1/Tc1 function by triggering cell death upon interaction with its ligand, galectin-9.
- VISTA: Short for V-domain Ig suppressor of T cell activation, VISTA is primarily expressed on hematopoietic cells so that consistent expression of VISTA on leukocytes within tumors may allow VISTA blockade to be effective across a broad range of solid tumors.
- SIGLEC7 (Sialic acid-binding immunoglobulin-type lectin 7, also designated as CD328) and SIGLEC9 (Sialic acid-binding immunoglobulin-type lectin 9, also designated as CD329) are proteins found on the surface of various immune cells, including natural killer cells and macrophages (SIGLEC7) and neutrophils, macrophages, dendritic cells and activated T-cells (SIGLEC9). SIGLECs 7 and 9 suppress the immune function of these cells by binding to terminal sialic acid on glycans that cover the surface of cells.

== Immune checkpoint inhibitors (ICIs) ==
Drugs or drug candidates that inhibit/block the inhibitory checkpoint molecules are known as checkpoint inhibitors; this idea is often referred to as immune checkpoint blockade (ICB), or simply checkpoint blockade. ICIs have revolutionized the field of oncology as they unleash pre-existing anti-tumor T-cell responses that recognize tumor antigens, by disrupting co-inhibitory T-cell signaling aforementioned. Among the different types of cancer immunotherapy, ICB has also had the broadest impact as it is able to induce long-term durable responses across multiple types of cancer (e.g., melanoma, non-small cell lung cancer (NSCLC), renal cell carcinoma, etc.). Checkpoint inhibitor drugs have seen growth in pharmaceutical research in cancer by companies including Bristol-Myers Squibb, Merck, Merck KGaA, Roche and AstraZeneca.
