= Spartalizumab =

Monoclonal antibody

Monoclonal antibody
- Type: Whole antibody
- Source: Humanized
- Target: PD-1 (CD279)

Clinical data
- Other names: PDR001
- ATC code: none

Identifiers
- CAS Number: 1935694-88-4
- UNII: QOG25L6Z8Z
- KEGG: D11605

Spartalizumab (INN; development code PDR001) is a monoclonal antibody and checkpoint inhibitor that is being investigated for melanoma.

This drug is being developed by Novartis. As of 2018, spartalizumab is undergoing Phase III trials.
