= George Sai Wah Tsao =

Professor of biomedical science

George Sai Wah Tsao (Chinese: 曹世華) was a professor of the School of Biomedical Sciences of the University of Hong Kong and the Director of the Faculty Core Facility of the Faculty of Medicine, the University of Hong Kong. Tsao researches the relationship between Epstein-Barr virus and nasopharyngeal carcinoma. He also created the first immortal human ovarian surface epithelial cell line.

== Education ==
Tsao graduated from the Chinese University of Hong Kong with a BSc degree, and received his PhD training at the University of London, Royal Marsden Hospital.

== Career ==
Tsao became a faculty member of the Chinese University of Hong Kong after receiving postgraduate training. However, he went to the Harvard Medical School to receive further postdoctoral training in 1987. Later on, he was appointed the Laboratory Director of the Gynecological Oncology Division, Brigham and Women's Hospital and assistant professor in Obstetrics and Gynecology, Harvard Medical School. He joined the University of Hong Kong in 1993, and is currently a faculty member of the Department of Anatomy and the deputy director of the Center for Cancer Research, the University of Hong Kong Li Ka Shing Faculty of Medicine.

Tsao died in December 2022.

== Research ==
Tsao's main research interest is nasopharyngeal carcinoma and Epstein-Barr virus, involving cell immortalization and malignant transformation. Emphasis is put on the relationship between latent infection of nasopharyngeal epithelial cells by Epstein-Barr virus and nasopharyngeal carcinoma.
