= VTCN1 =

Protein-coding gene in humans

Identifiers
- Aliases: VTCN1, B7-H4, B7H4, B7S1, B7X, B7h.5, PRO1291, VCTN1, V-set domain containing T cell activation inhibitor 1, V-set domain containing T-cell activation inhibitor 1
- External IDs: OMIM: 608162; MGI: 3039619; GeneCards: VTCN1
Available structures
PDB	Ortholog search: PDBe RCSB
PDB	List of PDB id codes 4GOS

Gene location (Human)
Chr.	Chromosome 1 (human)
Band	1p13.1-p12	Start	117,143,587 bp
Band	1p13.1-p12	End	117,210,960 bp

Gene location (Mouse)
Chr.	Chromosome 3 (mouse)
Band	3|3 F2.2	Start	100,732,775 bp
Band	3|3 F2.2	End	100,804,238 bp
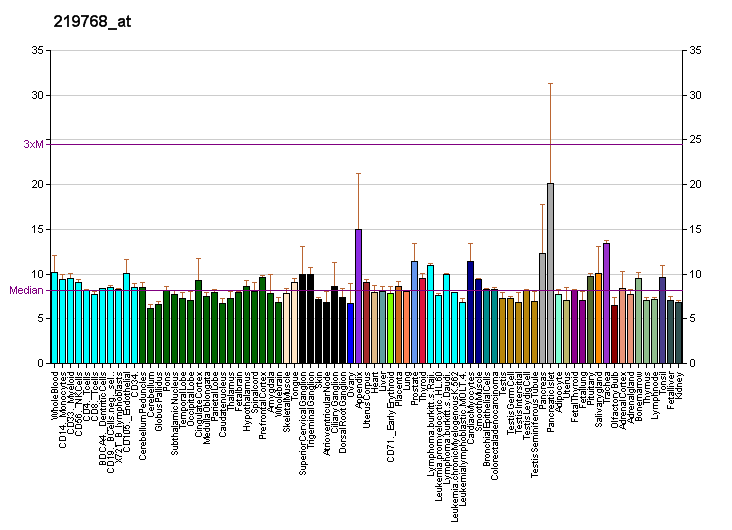
RNA expression pattern
Bgee	Human / Mouse (ortholog); Top expressed in: palpebral conjunctiva; epithelium of lactiferous gland; lactiferous duct; hair follicle; right uterine tube; islet of Langerhans; nasal epithelium; body of pancreas; olfactory zone of nasal mucosa; secondary oocyte / Top expressed in: blastocyst; morula; spermatid; uterus; lip; ascending aorta; aortic valve; cervix; esophagus; proximal tubule; More reference expression data
BioGPS	More reference expression data
Gene ontology
Molecular function	signaling receptor binding; molecular function
Cellular component	integral component of membrane; plasma membrane; membrane; external side of plasma membrane
Biological process	adaptive immune response; positive regulation of T cell proliferation; response to protozoan; immune system process; negative regulation of T cell proliferation; negative regulation of apoptotic process; negative regulation of T cell activation; regulation of immune response; T cell receptor signaling pathway
Sources:Amigo / QuickGO
Orthologs
Databases	NCBI: entry; OMA: entry
Species	Human	Mouse
Entrez	79679	242122
Ensembl	ENSG00000134258	ENSMUSG00000051076
UniProt	Q7Z7D3	Q7TSP5
RefSeq (mRNA)	NM_001253849; NM_001253850; NM_024626	NM_178594
RefSeq (protein)	NP_001240778; NP_001240779; NP_078902	NP_848709
Location (UCSC)	Chr 1: 117.14 – 117.21 Mb	Chr 3: 100.73 – 100.8 Mb
PubMed search
- Wikidata
View/Edit Human	View/Edit Mouse

V-set domain-containing T-cell activation inhibitor 1 is a protein that in humans is encoded by the VTCN1 gene.

== Function ==
B7H4 belongs to the B7 family (see CD80; MIM 112203) of costimulatory proteins. These proteins are expressed on the surface of antigen-presenting cells and interact with ligands (e.g., CD28; MIM 186760) on T lymphocytes.[supplied by OMIM]

B7-H4 is an immune checkpoint molecule.

== See also ==
- B7 (protein)
