= Checkpoint inhibitor =

Form of cancer immunotherapy

Checkpoint inhibitor therapy is a form of cancer immunotherapy. The therapy targets immune checkpoints, key regulators of the immune system that when stimulated can dampen the immune response to an immunologic stimulus. Some cancers can protect themselves from attack by stimulating immune checkpoint targets. Checkpoint therapy can block inhibitory checkpoints, restoring immune system function. The first anti-cancer drug targeting an immune checkpoint was ipilimumab, a CTLA4 blocker approved in the United States in 2011.

Currently approved checkpoint inhibitors target the molecules CTLA4, PD-1, and PD-L1. PD-1 is the transmembrane programmed cell death 1 protein (also called PDCD1 and CD279), which interacts with PD-L1 (PD-1 ligand 1, or CD274). PD-L1 on the cell surface binds to PD-1 on an immune cell surface, which inhibits immune cell activity. Among PD-L1's functions is a key regulatory role on T cell activities. It appears that (cancer-mediated) upregulation of PD-L1 on the cell surface may inhibit T cells that might otherwise attack. Antibodies that bind to either PD-1 or PD-L1 and therefore block the interaction may allow the T-cells to attack the tumor.

The discoveries in basic science allowing checkpoint inhibitor therapies led to James P. Allison and Tasuku Honjo winning the Tang Prize in Biopharmaceutical Science and the Nobel Prize in Physiology or Medicine in 2018.

== Types ==
Approved checkpoint inhibitors
Name	Brand Name	Marketing rights	Target	Approved	Indications (May 2023)
Ipilimumab	Yervoy	Bristol-Myers Squibb	CTLA-4	2011	metastatic melanoma, renal cell carcinoma, colorectal cancer, hepatocellular carcinoma, non-small cell lung cancer, malignant pleural mesothelioma, esophageal squamous carcinoma (in combination with Nivolumab)
Tremelimumab	Imjudo	AstraZeneca	CTLA-4	2022	hepatocellular carcinoma (in combination with Durvalumab), non-small-cell lung cancer (in combination with Durvalumab and platinum-based chemotherapy)
Nivolumab	Opdivo	Bristol-Myers Squibb (North America) + Ono Pharmaceutical (other countries)	PD-1	2014	metastatic melanoma, non-small cell lung cancer, renal cell carcinoma, Hodgkin's lymphoma, head and neck cancer, urothelial carcinoma, colorectal cancer, hepatocellular carcinoma, small cell lung cancer, esophageal carcinoma, malignant pleural mesothelioma, gastric cancer (or gastroesophageal junction cancer)
Pembrolizumab	Keytruda	Merck Sharp & Dohme	PD-1	2014	metastatic melanoma, non-small cell lung cancer, head and neck cancer, Hodgkin's lymphoma, urothelial carcinoma, gastric cancer, cervical cancer, hepatocellular carcinoma, Merkel cell carcinoma, renal cell carcinoma, small cell lung cancer, esophageal carcinoma, endometrial cancer, squamous cell carcinoma, biliary tract cancer
Atezolizumab	Tecentriq	Genentech/Roche	PD-L1	2016	bladder cancer, non-small cell lung cancer, breast cancer, small cell lung cancer, hepatocellular carcinoma, metastatic melanoma
Avelumab	Bavencio	Merck KGaA and Pfizer	PD-L1	2017	Merkel cell carcinoma, urothelial carcinoma, renal cell carcinoma
Durvalumab	Imfinzi	Medimmune/AstraZeneca	PD-L1	2017	non-small cell lung cancer, small cell lung cancer, biliary tract cancer
Cemiplimab	Libtayo	Regeneron	PD-1	2018	squamous cell carcinoma, basal cell carcinoma, non-small cell lung cancer, cervical cancer
Dostarlimab	Jemperli	Tesaro	PD-1	2021	endometrial cancer
Relatlimab Nivolumab	Opdualag	Bristol-Myers Squibb	LAG-3 and PD-1	2022	For people aged 12 or older with previously untreated melanoma that cannot be removed surgically or has metastasized within the body

=== Cell surface checkpoint inhibitors ===
==== CTLA-4 inhibitors ====
The first checkpoint antibody approved by the FDA was ipilimumab, approved in 2011 for treatment of melanoma. It blocks the immune checkpoint molecule CTLA-4. Clinical trials have also shown some benefits of anti-CTLA-4 therapy on lung cancer or pancreatic cancer, specifically in combination with other drugs.

However, patients treated with check-point blockade (specifically CTLA-4 blocking antibodies), or a combination of check-point blocking antibodies, are at high risk of immune-related adverse events such as dermatologic, gastrointestinal, endocrine, or hepatic autoimmune reactions. These are most likely due to the breadth of the induced T-cell activation when anti-CTLA-4 antibodies are administered by injection in the blood stream.

Using a mouse model of bladder cancer, researchers have found that a local injection of a low dose anti-CTLA-4 in the tumour area had the same tumour inhibiting capacity as when the antibody was delivered in the blood. At the same time the levels of circulating antibodies were lower, suggesting that local administration of the anti-CTLA-4 therapy might result in fewer adverse events.

==== PD-1 inhibitors ====
Initial clinical trial results with IgG4 PD-1 antibody nivolumab (under the brand name Opdivo and developed by Bristol-Myers Squibb) were published in 2010. It was approved in 2014. Nivolumab is approved to treat melanoma, lung cancer, kidney cancer, bladder cancer, head and neck cancer, and Hodgkin's lymphoma.

- Pembrolizumab (brand name Keytruda) is another PD-1 inhibitor that was approved by the FDA in 2014 and was the second checkpoint inhibitor approved in the United States. Keytruda is approved to treat melanoma and lung cancer and is produced by Merck.
- Spartalizumab (PDR001) is a PD-1 inhibitor being developed by Novartis to treat both solid tumors and lymphomas.

==== PD-L1 inhibitors ====
In May 2016, PD-L1 inhibitor atezolizumab was approved for treating bladder cancer.

LAG-3 Inhibitors

In 2022, the FDA approved a combination of relatlimab and nivolumab (Opdivo) to be marketed under the name Opdualag for people aged 12 or older with previously untreated melanoma that cannot be removed surgically or has spread (metastasized) within the body. Relatlimab blocks a protein on immune cells called LAG-3.

=== Intracellular checkpoint inhibitors ===
Other modes of enhancing [adoptive] immunotherapy include targeting so-called intrinsic checkpoint blockades. Many of these intrinsic regulators include molecules with ubiquitin ligase activity, including CBLB, and CISH.

==== CISH ====
More recently, CISH (cytokine-inducible SH2-containing protein), another molecule with ubiquitin ligase activity, was found to be induced by T cell receptor ligation (TCR) and negatively regulate it by targeting the critical signaling intermediate PLC-gamma-1 for degradation. The deletion of CISH in effector T cells has been shown to dramatically augment TCR signaling and subsequent effector cytokine release, proliferation and survival. The adoptive transfer of tumor-specific effector T cells knocked out or knocked down for CISH resulted in a significant increase in functional avidity and long-term tumor immunity. Surprisingly there was no changes in activity of Cish's purported target, STAT5. CISH knock out in T cells increased PD-1 expression and the adoptive transfer of CISH knock out T cells synergistically combined with PD-1 antibody blockade resulting in durable tumor regression and survival in a preclinical animal model. Thus, Cish represents a new class of T-cell intrinsic immunologic checkpoints with the potential to radically enhance adoptive immunotherapies for cancer.

== Adverse effects ==
Immune-related adverse events may be caused by checkpoint inhibitors. Altering checkpoint inhibition can have diverse effects on most organ systems of the body. Colitis (inflammation of the colon) occurs commonly. The precise mechanism is unknown, but differs in some respects based on the molecule targeted. Thyroiditis with resulting hypothyroidism is a common Immune-related adverse event especially with use of combinations of different ICIs. The underlying mechanism of ICI induced thyroiditis may differ from other forms of thyroiditis. Hypophysitis seems to be more specific to CTLA-4 inhibitors. Infusion of checkpoint inhibitors has also been associated with acute seronegative myasthenia gravis. A lower incidence of hypothyroidism was observed in a trial of combined B cell depletion and immune checkpoint inhibitor treatment compared with studies of immune checkpoint inhibitor monotherapy. This holds promise for combining check point inhibitor therapy with immunosuppressive drugs to achieve anti-cancer effects with less toxicity.

Studies are beginning to show that intrinsic factors, such as species of the genus Bacteroides that inhabit the gut microbiome prospectively modify risk of developing immune related adverse events. Further evidence of this can be found in patients that saw reversal of immune toxicity following fecal microbiome transplant from healthy donors.

Severe immune-related adverse events do not spontaneously subside and (with some exceptions) require immunosuppressive treatment. High-dose corticosteroids are usually used in first-line therapy, while selective immunosuppression may be required in steroid-resistant toxicities. Biomarkers for prediction of steroid resistance are topic of research. Enhanced type 1/type 17 immune responses may be associated with immune-related adverse events that do not respond to corticosteroids.

== See also ==
- Adoptive cell transfer
- Cancer immunotherapy
- Chimeric antigen receptor
- Immune checkpoint
