= Lymphoepithelioma-like carcinoma =

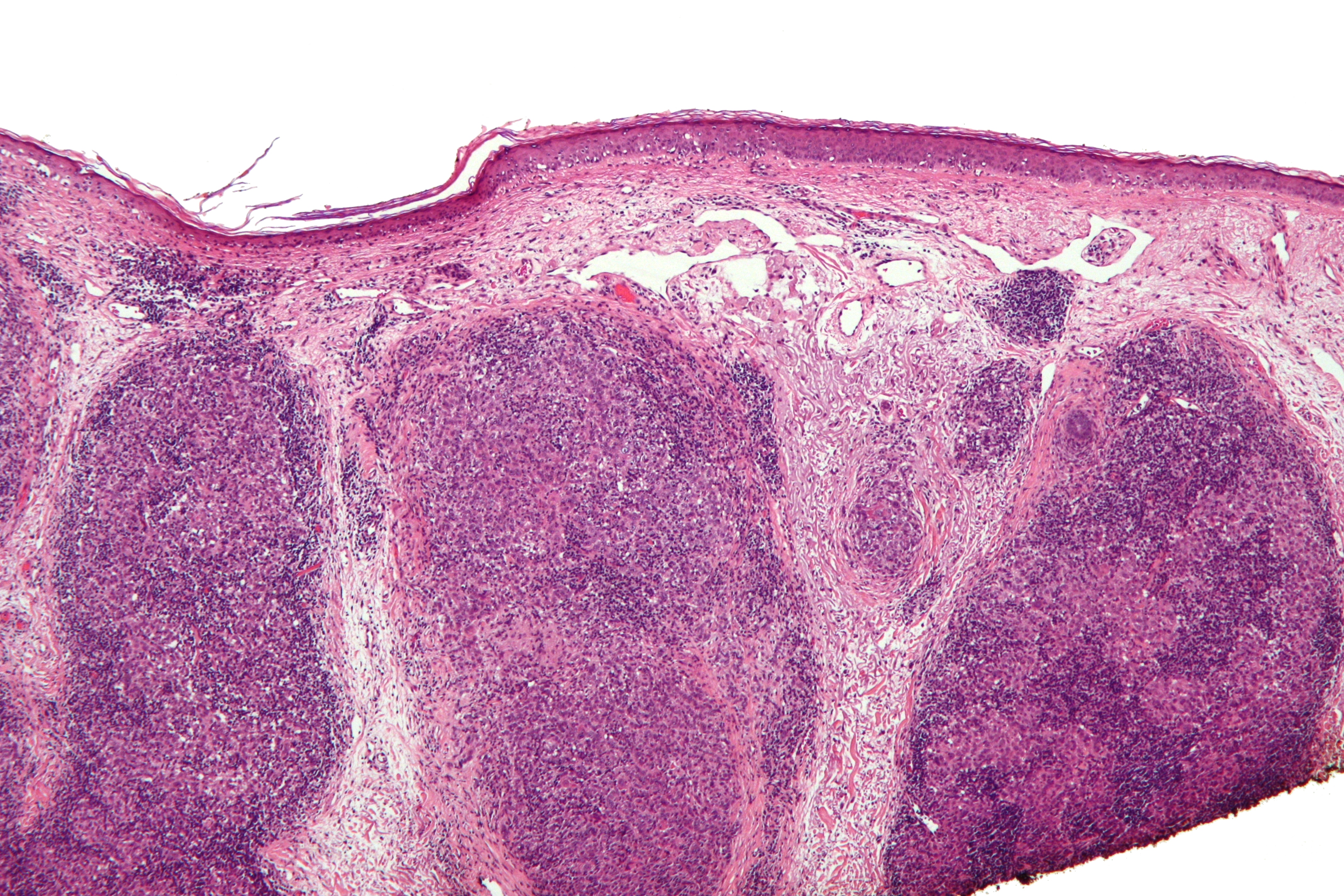
- Low magnification micrograph of a lymphoepithelioma-like carcinoma showing the characteristic squamoid nests in association with clusters of lymphocytes. H&E stain.
- Specialty: Oncology

Lymphoepithelioma-like carcinoma (LELC) is a medical term referring to a histological variant of malignant tumor arising from the uncontrolled mitosis of transformed cells originating in epithelial tissue (or in cells that display epithelial characteristics) that bear microscopic resemblance to lymphoepithelioma (nasopharyngeal carcinoma).

There is considerable variation in the classification of LELC—while it is perhaps most commonly considered a subtype of squamous cell carcinoma, it can also be classified as a form of large cell carcinoma (i.e. when occurring in the lung), and can be considered as a separate, unique entity.

In most anatomical sites, many cases are associated with the Epstein–Barr virus.

In the breast, the macroscopic, microscopic, epidemiologic, and prognostic features of LELC are very similar to medullary carcinoma; EBV status is one differentiator.

== See also ==
- Nasopharyngeal carcinoma
- Lymphoepithelioma
