= Endoscopic nasopharyngectomy =

Surgical treatment for nasopharyngeal carcinoma

- Specialty: Otorhinolaryngology

Endoscopic nasopharyngectomy is a form of endoscopic surgery to treat nasopharyngeal carcinoma. This type of cancer is commonly treated with radiation therapy and chemotherapy, but endoscopic operation offers an alternative treatment, especially when the radiation therapy fails.

In the early stages of oncology, endoscopic surgeries were considered to be radical treatment, despite the surgery being minimally invasive. The surgery is effective in the treatment of recently diagnosed localized nasopharyngeal cancer for stage I patients.

Patient selection is extremely important in order to avoid surgical complications. Patients diagnosed with rT1 or rT2 tumors, and some rT3 tumors, may be candidates for the surgery.
