= B7 (protein) =

Integral membrane protein

B7 is a type of integral membrane protein found on activated antigen-presenting cells (APC) that, when paired with either a CD28 or CD152 (CTLA-4) surface protein on a T cell, can produce a costimulatory signal or a coinhibitory signal to enhance or decrease the activity of a MHC-TCR signal between the APC and the T cell, respectively. Binding of the B7 of APC to CTLA-4 of T-cells causes inhibition of the activity of T-cells.

There are two major types of B7 proteins: B7-1 or CD80, and B7-2 or CD86. It is not known if they differ significantly from each other. So far CD80 is found on dendritic cells, macrophages, and activated B cells, CD86 (B7-2) on B cells. The proteins CD28 and CTLA-4 (CD152) each interact with both B7-1 and B7-2.

== Costimulation ==
There are several steps to activation of the immune system against a pathogen. The T-cell receptor must first interact with the Major histocompatibility complex (MHC) surface protein. The CD4 or CD8 proteins on the T-cell surface form a complex with the CD3 protein, which can then recognize the MHC. This is also called "Signal 1" and its main purpose is to guarantee antigen specificity of the T cell activation.

However, MHC binding itself is insufficient for producing a T cell response. In fact, lack of further stimulatory signals sends the T cell into anergy. The costimulatory signal necessary to continue the immune response can come from B7-CD28 and CD40–CD40L interactions.

When CD40 on the APC binds CD40L(CD154) on the T cell, signals are sent back to both the APC and the T cell. (1) The signal from the APC to the T cell informs the T cell that it must express CD28 on its surface. (2) The signal from the T cell to the APC informs the APC to express B7 (which can be either B7.1 or B7.2). It is the B7-CD28 interaction that leads to activation of the T cell. Importantly, the B7-CD28 binding additionally instructs the T cell to produce CTLA-4 (the competitor for CD28). Since CTLA-4 also binds to B7 it decreases the B7 that can bind to CD28. The B7-CTLA-4 binding suppresses T cell activation. The balance between the opposing signals generated by B7-CD28 and B7-CTLA-4 binding regulates the intensity of the T cell response.

There are other activation signals which play a role in immune responses. In the TNF family of molecules, the protein 4-1BB (CD137) on the T cell may bind to 4-1BB ligand (4-1BBL) on the APC.

The B7 (B7-1/B7-2) protein is present on the APC surface, and it interacts with the CD28 receptor on the T cell surface. This is one source of "Signal 2" (cytokines can also contribute to T-cell activation, called "Signal 3"). This interaction produces a series of downstream signals which promote the target T cell's survival and activation.

Blockade of CD28 is effective in stopping T cell activation, a mechanism that the immune system uses to down-regulate T cell activation. T cells can express the surface protein CTLA-4 (CD152) as well, which can also bind B7, but with twenty times greater affinity for B7 proteins, and lacks the ability to activate T cells. As a result, the T cell is blocked from receiving the B7 protein signal and is not activated. CTLA-4-knockout mice are unable to stop immune responses, and develop a fatal massive lymphocyte proliferation.

== Members of the family ==
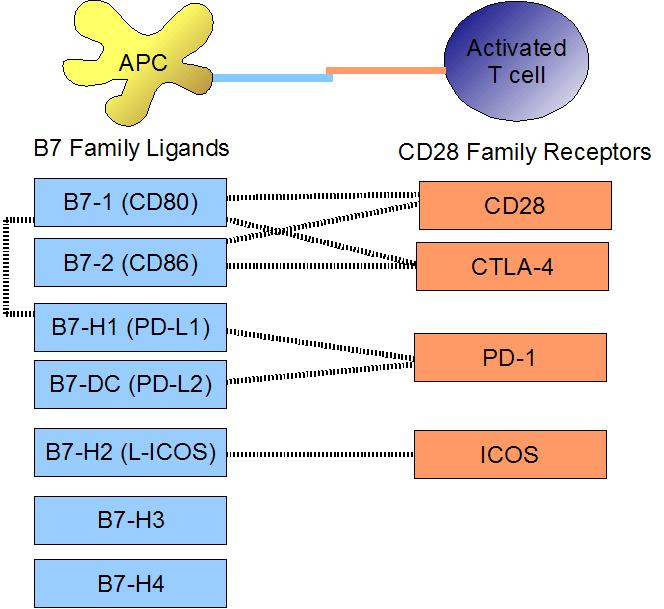
Binding interactions

Apart from B7-1 and B7-2, there are other proteins grouped in the B7 family, as summarized in the following table.

Name	Alternative names	Binds to
B7-1	CD80	CD28, CTLA-4, PD-L1
B7-2	CD86	CD28, CTLA-4
B7-DC	PDCD1LG2, PD-L2, CD273	PD-1
B7-H1	PD-L1, CD274	PD-1
B7-H2	ICOSLG, B7RP1, CD275	ICOS
B7-H3	CD276	
B7-H4	VTCN1	
B7-H5	VISTA, Platelet receptor Gi24, SISP1	
B7-H6	NCR3LG1	NKp30
B7-H7	HHLA2	CD28H
