= Pharyngeal recess =

Anatomy of the human nose

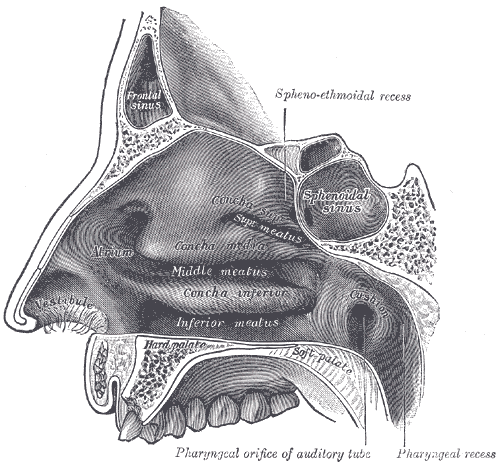
- Lateral wall of nasal cavity. (Pharyngeal recess labeled at bottom right.)

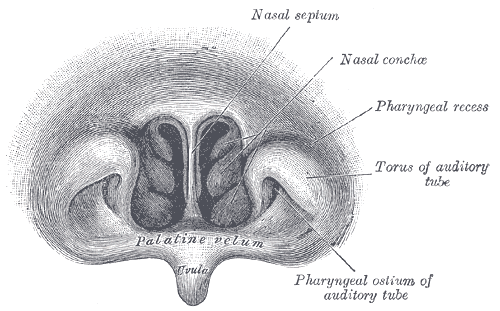
- Front of nasal part of pharynx, as seen with the laryngoscope. (Pharyngeal recess labeled at center right.)

Details

Identifiers
- Latin: recessus pharyngeus
- TA98: A05.3.01.017
- TA2: 2873
- FMA: 54999

Behind the ostium of the eustachian tube (ostium pharyngeum tuba auditiva) is a deep recess, the pharyngeal recess (fossa of Rosenmüller).

== Clinical significance ==
At the base of this recess is the retropharyngeal lymph node (the node of Rouvière). This is clinically significant in that it may be involved in certain head and neck cancers, notably nasopharyngeal cancer.
