= Serplulimab =

Medication

Monoclonal antibody
- Type: Whole antibody
- Source: Humanized (from mouse)
- Target: PD-1

Clinical data
- Trade names: Hansizhuang
- Other names: HLX10
- Routes of administration: Intravenous
- Drug class: Antineoplastic
- ATC code: L01FF12 (WHO)

Legal status
- Legal status: EU: Rx-only; In general: ℞ (Prescription only)

Identifiers
- CAS Number: 2231029-82-4
- DrugBank: DB17451
- UNII: S3GQZ2K36V
- KEGG: D12751

Serplulimab, sold under the brand name Hansizhuang among others, is a monoclonal antibody used for the treatment of cancers.

== Medical uses ==
Serplulimab, in combination with carboplatin and etoposide, is indicated for the first-line treatment of adults with extensive-stage small cell lung cancer.

== Society and culture ==
=== Legal status ===
It was approved for medical use in China in 2022, for the treatment of squamous non-small cell lung cancer, and in 2023, for the treatment of extensive-stage small cell lung cancer (ES-SCLC) and esophageal squamous cell carcinoma. In 2024, it was approved by the China National Medical Products Administration (NMPA) for the treatment of non-squamous non-small cell lung cancer (nsqNSCLC) .

In December 2023, the Indonesian Food and Drug Authority approved serplulimab for medical use in Indonesia.

In September 2024, the Committee for Medicinal Products for Human Use of the European Medicines Agency adopted a positive opinion, recommending the granting of a marketing authorization for the medicinal product Hetronifly, intended for the treatment of extensive-stage small cell lung cancer (ES-SCLC). The applicant for this medicinal product is Henlius Europe GmbH. Serplulimab was authorized for medical use in the European Union in February 2025.

In November 2025, serplulimab (Olizu) was approved for medical use in Peru for the first-line treatment of extensive-stage small cell lung cancer (ES-SCLC). It is the first and only anti-PD-1 mAb approved for the first-line treatment of ES-SCLC in the LATAM.

In May 2026, the European Commission approved two additional indications for serplulimab (Hetronifly) for the first-line treatment of non-squamous non-small cell lung carcinoma and esophageal squamous cell carcinoma.

In June 2026, serplulimab (Hansizhuang) was approved by the China National Medical Products Administration (NMPA) for the perioperative treatment of resectable gastric cancer. This makes it the world’s first anti-PD-1 monoclonal antibody approved for this indication, replacing traditional adjuvant chemotherapy with immunotherapy monotherapy.

As of June 2026, serplulimab has been approved in 50 countries and regions including China, the United Kingdom, the European Union, Singapore, India, Switzerland, and Peru.

=== Names ===
Serplulimab is the International nonproprietary name.

Serplulimab is sold under the brand names Hansizhuang, Hetronifly, and Olizu.
