= Relatlimab =

Monoclonal antibody

Monoclonal antibody
- Type: Whole antibody
- Source: Human
- Target: Lymphocyte activation gene-3 (LAG-3)

Clinical data
- Other names: BMS-986016, relatlimab-rmbw
- License data: US DailyMed: Relatlimab
- Routes of administration: Intravenous
- Drug class: Antineoplastic
- ATC code: None

Legal status
- Legal status: CA: ℞-only; US: ℞-only only in combination with nivolumab

Identifiers
- CAS Number: 1673516-98-7
- DrugBank: DB14851
- UNII: AF75XOF6W3
- KEGG: D11350

Chemical and physical data
- Formula: C_{6472}H_{9922}N_{1710}O_{2024}S_{38}
- Molar mass: 145288.79 g·mol^{−1}

Relatlimab is a monoclonal antibody designed for the treatment of melanoma. It is used in combination with nivolumab to treat melanoma.

Relatlimab is a Lymphocyte activation gene-3 (LAG-3) inhibitor. It is under development by Bristol-Myers Squibb. It is made using Chinese hamster ovary cells.

== History ==
In 2004, Drew Pardoll and colleagues discovered that the lymphocyte-activation gene 3, or LAG-3, was a new immune checkpoint. Checkpoints inhibitors are proteins that stop the immune system from responding to cancer cells. Checkpoint inhibitor drugs block these proteins, unleashing the immune system to battle the cancer.

As stated in the official Johns Hopkins Technological Ventures Press:

- 2004: Drew Pardoll discovers that LAG-3 is a new immune checkpoint.
- 2010: Pardoll and his research team begin a study to see how relatlimab, a LAG-3 blocking drug, treats cancer in mice.
- 2012: Findings from the study are published showing that a combination of a LAG-3 blocker and PD-1 blocker is an effective cancer treatment.
- 2016: The Join effort including Drew Pardoll, Shirley Liu, Cliff Meyer and Eduardo Gusmao has led to significant advances on the effectiveness as LAG-3 + PD-1 checkpoint blockade immunotherapy.
- 2018: The RELATIVITY-047 trial begins enrolling patients and randomly assigning them to receive relatlimab with nivolumab or nivolumab alone.
- January 2022: Results from the RELATIVITY-047 trial published in The New England Journal of Medicine show the combination treatment with relatlimab to be a more effective treatment than nivolumab alone.
- March 2022: The FDA gives approval for the combination treatment (relatlimab and nivolumab, marketed as Opdualag) as a new therapy for patients with metastatic or inoperable melanoma.

The combination nivolumab/relatlimab (Opdualag) was approved for medical use in the United States in March 2022.

== Names ==
Relatlimab is the United States Adopted Name (USAN) and the international nonproprietary name (INN).
