= PDCD1LG2 =

Protein-coding gene in the species Homo sapiens

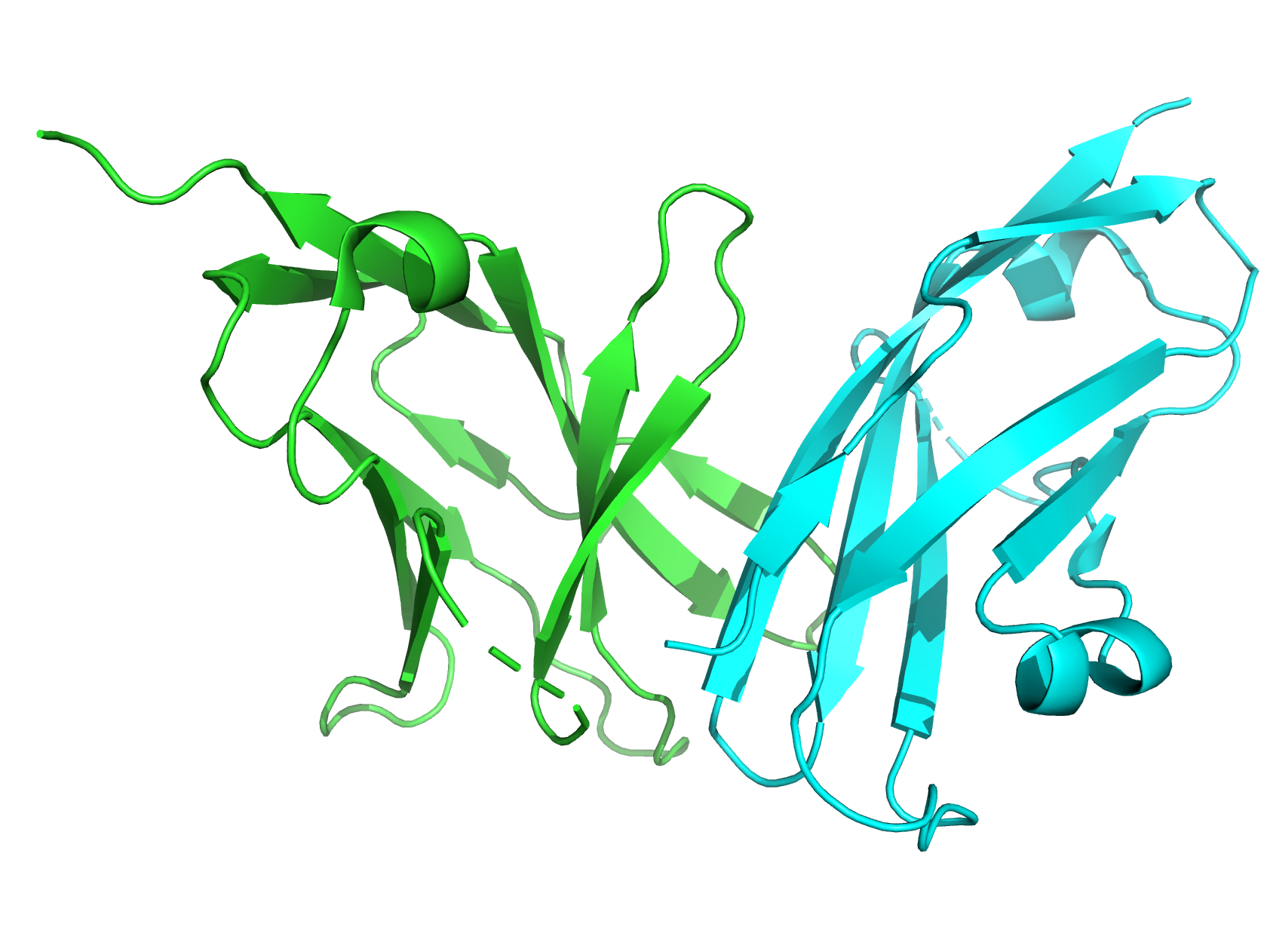
- Crystallographic structure of the human PD-1 (green) / PD-L2 (cyan) complex

Identifiers
- Aliases: PDCD1LG2, B7DC, Btdc, CD273, PD-L2, PDCD1L2, PDL2, bA574F11.2, programmed cell death 1 ligand 2
- External IDs: OMIM: 605723; MGI: 1930125; GeneCards: PDCD1LG2

Gene location (Human)
Chr.	Chromosome 9 (human)
Band	9p24.1	Start	5,510,531 bp
Band	9p24.1	End	5,571,282 bp

Gene location (Mouse)
Chr.	Chromosome 19 (mouse)
Band	19|19 C1	Start	29,388,319 bp
Band	19|19 C1	End	29,448,561 bp
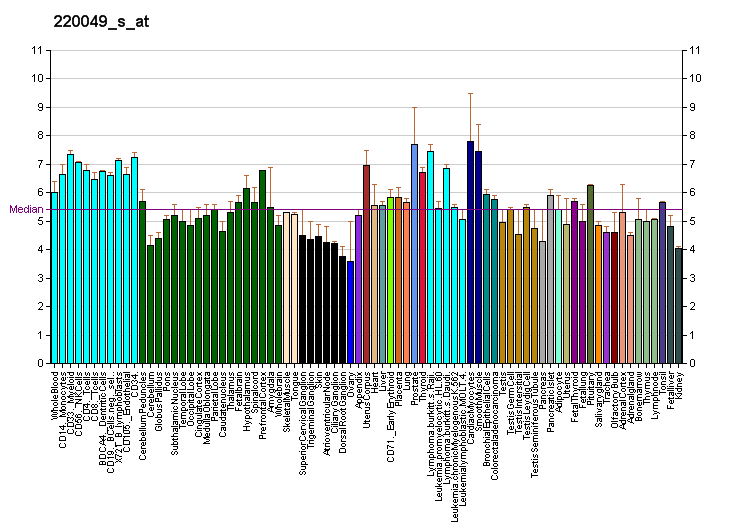
RNA expression pattern
Bgee	Human / Mouse (ortholog); Top expressed in: stromal cell of endometrium; testicle; Achilles tendon; appendix; lymph node; spleen; gallbladder; smooth muscle tissue; upper lobe of left lung; right lung / Top expressed in: gastrula; embryo; submandibular gland; thymus; mesenteric lymph nodes; lumbar spinal ganglion; tibiofemoral joint; spleen; skin of abdomen; blood; More reference expression data
BioGPS	More reference expression data
Gene ontology
Molecular function	molecular function; protein binding
Cellular component	integral component of membrane; extracellular region; endomembrane system; membrane; plasma membrane; external side of plasma membrane; cell surface
Biological process	negative regulation of activated T cell proliferation; T cell costimulation; negative regulation of interleukin-10 production; negative regulation of T cell proliferation; negative regulation of interferon-gamma production; immune response; positive regulation of T cell proliferation; signal transduction; cell surface receptor signaling pathway; cellular response to lipopolysaccharide; adaptive immune response; immune system process
Sources:Amigo / QuickGO
Orthologs
Databases	NCBI: entry; OMA: entry
Species	Human	Mouse
Entrez	80380	58205
Ensembl	ENSG00000197646	ENSMUSG00000016498
UniProt	Q9BQ51	Q9WUL5
RefSeq (mRNA)	NM_025239	NM_021396
RefSeq (protein)	NP_079515	NP_067371
Location (UCSC)	Chr 9: 5.51 – 5.57 Mb	Chr 19: 29.39 – 29.45 Mb
PubMed search
- Wikidata
View/Edit Human	View/Edit Mouse

Programmed cell death 1 ligand 2 (also known as PD-L2, B7-DC) is a protein that in humans is encoded by the PDCD1LG2 gene. PDCD1LG2 has also been designated as CD273 (cluster of differentiation 273). PDCD1LG2 is an immune checkpoint receptor ligand which plays a role in negative regulation of the adaptive immune response. PD-L2 is one of two known ligands for Programmed cell death protein 1 (PD-1), the other one being PD-L1 to which it is related by a gene duplication in an ancestor of tetrapod species.

== Tissue distribution ==
PD-L2 is primarily expressed on professional antigen-presenting cells including dendritic cells (DCs) and macrophages. Others have shown PD-L2 expression in certain T helper cell subsets and cytotoxic T cells. PD-L2 protein is widely expressed in many healthy tissues including the GI tract tissues, skeletal muscles, tonsils, and pancreas. Additionally, PD-L2 has moderate to high expression in triple-negative breast cancer and gastric cancer and low expression in renal cell carcinoma. PD-L2 mRNA is widely expressed and not enriched in any particular tissue.

== Regulation ==
Interleukin-4 (IL-4) and granulocyte-macrophage colony stimulating factor (GMCSF) both upregulate PD-L2 expression in DCs in vitro. IFN-α, IFN-β, and IFN-γ induce moderate upregulation of PD-L2 expression.

== Structure ==
PD-L2 is a cell surface receptor belonging to the B7 protein family. It consists of both an immunoglobulin-like variable domain and an immunoglobulin-like constant domain in the extracellular region, a transmembrane domain, and a cytoplasmic domain. PD-L2 shares considerable sequence homology with other B7 proteins, but it does not contain the putative binding sequence for CD28/CTLA4, namely SQDXXXELY or XXXYXXRT.

The crystal structure of murine PD-L2 bound to murine PD-1 has been determined. as well as the structure of the hPD-L2/mutant hPD-1 complex.

== Function ==
PD-L2 binds to its receptor PD-1 with dissociation constant K_{d} of 11.3 nM. Binding to PD-1 can activate pathways inhibiting TCR/BCR-mediated immune cell activation (for a more detailed discussion see PD-1 signaling). PD-L2 plays an important role in immune tolerance and autoimmunity. Both PD-L1 and PD-L2 can inhibit T cell proliferation and inflammatory cytokine production. Blocking PD-L2 has been shown to exacerbate experimental autoimmune encephalomyelitis. Unlike PD-L1, PD-L2 has been shown activate the immune system, but this has only been demonstrated in mice and evidence against this exists in humans. PD-L2 triggers IL-12 production in murine dendritic cells leading to T cell activation. Others have shown that treatment with PD-L2 Ig led to T helper cell proliferation.

== Clinical significance ==
PD-L2, PD-L1, and PD-1 expressions are important in the immune response to certain cancers. Due to their role in suppressing the adaptive immune system, efforts have been made to block PD-1 and PD-L1, resulting in FDA approved inhibitors for both (see pembrolizumab, nivolumab, atezolizumab). There are still no FDA approved inhibitors for PD-L2 as of 2019.

The direct role of PD-L2 in cancer progression and immune-tumor microenvironment regulation is not as well studied as the role of PD-L1. In mouse cell cultures, PD-L2 expression on tumor cells suppressed cytotoxic T cell-mediated immune responses.

Indirectly, PD-L2 may have utility as a biomarker or prognostic indicator. PD-L2 expression has been shown to predict response to PD-1 blockade with pembrolizumab independently of PD-L1 expression. However, PD-L2 does not putatively predict outcome in cancer, with some studies suggesting it predicts negative prognoses and other studies suggesting it predicts positive prognoses.
