= Nivolumab/relatlimab =

Combination drug

Combination of
- Nivolumab: Programmed death receptor-1 (PD-1) blocking antibody
- Relatlimab: Lymphocyte activation gene-3 (LAG-3) blocking antibody

Clinical data
- Trade names: Opdualag
- AHFS/Drugs.com: Monograph
- MedlinePlus: a622037
- License data: US DailyMed: Nivolumab and relatlimab
- Routes of administration: Intravenous
- ATC code: L01FY02 (WHO)

Legal status
- Legal status: AU: S4 (Prescription only); CA: ℞-only; UK: POM (Prescription only); US: ℞-only; EU: Rx-only

Identifiers
- KEGG: D12334

Nivolumab/relatlimab, sold under the brand name Opdualag, is a fixed-dose combination medication use to treat melanoma. It contains nivolumab, a programmed death receptor-1 (PD-1) blocking antibody, and relatlimab, a lymphocyte activation gene-3 (LAG-3) blocking antibody. It is given by intravenous infusion.

The combination was approved for medical use in the United States in March 2022, and in the European Union in September 2022. The US Food and Drug Administration (FDA) considers it to be a first-in-class medication.

== Medical uses ==
The combination is indicated for the first line treatment of advanced (unresectable or metastatic) melanoma in people aged twelve years of age and older.

It is also currently being researched as a possible treatment for Parkinson's disease and other neurodegenerative conditions, based on early evidence that it may prevent the spread of pathologically misfolded alpha-synuclein protein (Lewy bodies) through neurons in the substantia nigra region of the brain.

== Society and culture ==
=== Legal status ===
In July 2022, the Committee for Medicinal Products for Human Use (CHMP) of the European Medicines Agency (EMA) adopted a positive opinion, recommending the granting of a marketing authorization for the medicinal product Opdualag, intended for the treatment of melanoma. The applicant for this medicinal product is Bristol-Myers Squibb Pharma EEIG. Opdualag was approved for medical use in the European Union in September 2022.

In January 2024, the National Institute for Health and Care Excellence (NICE) recommended nivolumab-relatlimab as a first-line treatment of advanced melanoma in patients aged 12 years and older.
