= SIGLEC7 =

Protein-coding gene in the species Homo sapiens

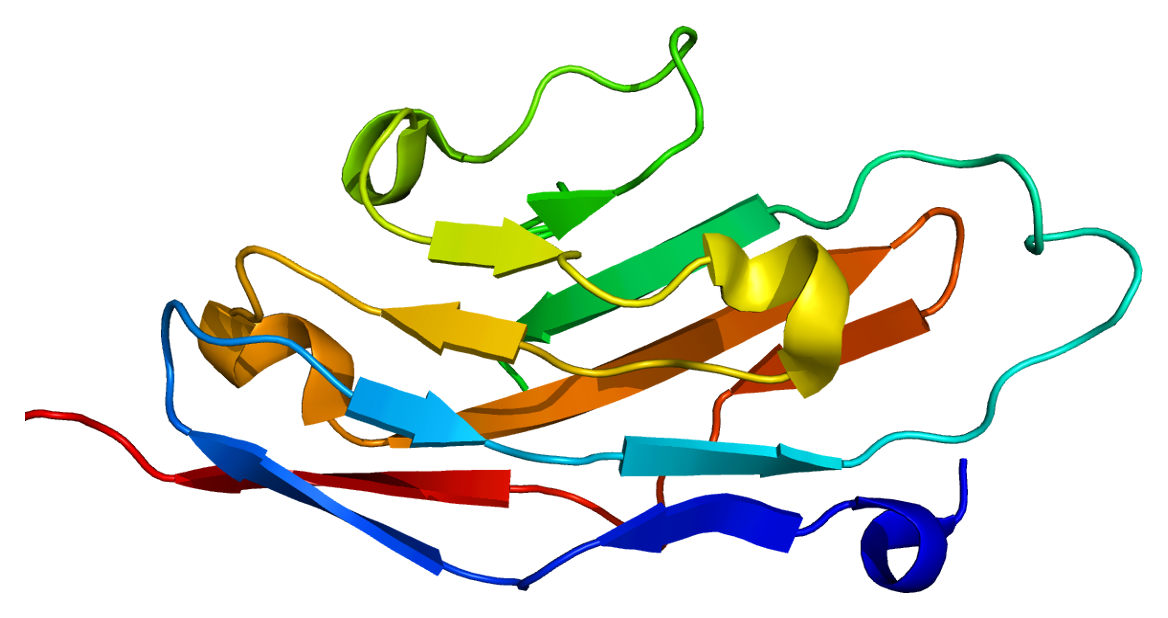

Identifiers
- Aliases: SIGLEC7, AIRM1, CD328, CDw328, D-siglec, QA79, SIGLEC-7, SIGLEC19P, SIGLECP2, p75, p75/AIRM1, sialic acid binding Ig like lectin 7, AIRM-1
- External IDs: OMIM: 604410; MGI: 1932475; GeneCards: SIGLEC7
Available structures
PDB	Ortholog search: PDBe RCSB
PDB	List of PDB id codes 1NKO, 1O7S, 1O7V, 2DF3, 2G5R, 2HRL

Gene location (Human)
Chr.	Chromosome 19 (human)
Band	19q13.41	Start	51,142,299 bp
Band	19q13.41	End	51,153,526 bp

Gene location (Mouse)
Chr.	Chromosome 7 (mouse)
Band	7 B3|7	Start	43,300,494 bp
Band	7 B3|7	End	43,309,585 bp
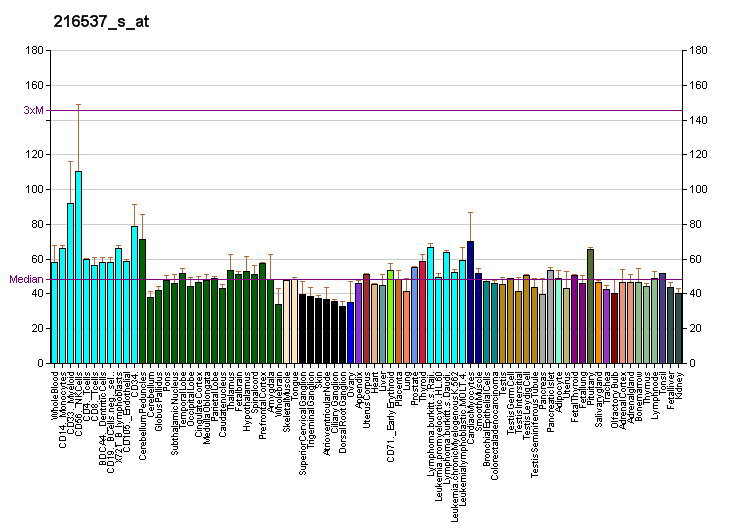

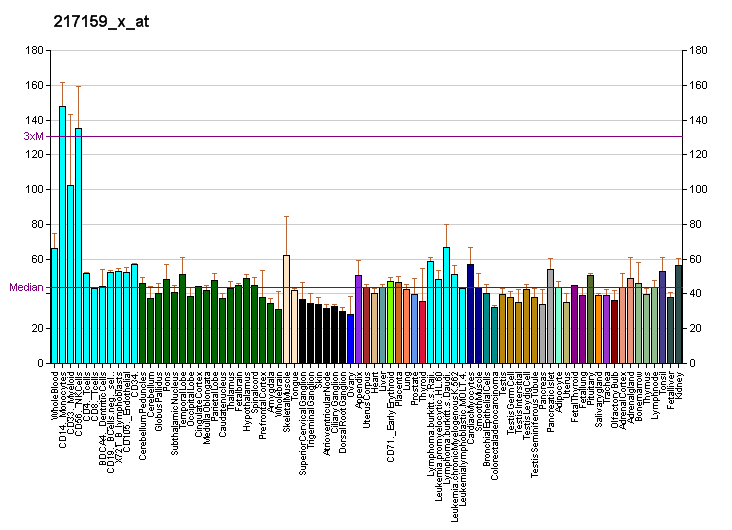

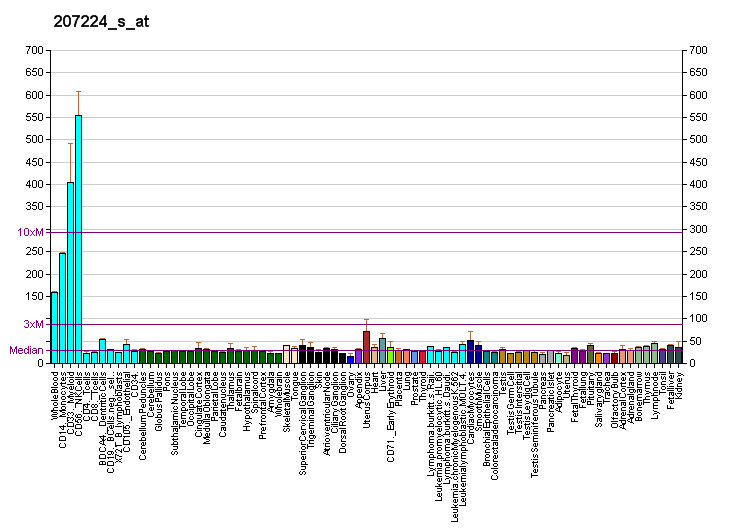
RNA expression pattern
Bgee	Human / Mouse (ortholog); Top expressed in: granulocyte; monocyte; blood; spleen; gonad; testicle; appendix; amniotic fluid; lymph node; right adrenal cortex / Top expressed in: granulocyte; zygote; secondary oocyte; spleen; blood; embryo; embryo; right kidney; bone marrow; primary oocyte; More reference expression data
BioGPS	More reference expression data
Gene ontology
Molecular function	carbohydrate binding; signaling receptor activity
Cellular component	integral component of membrane; plasma membrane; integral component of plasma membrane; membrane
Biological process	cell adhesion; regulation of immune response; signal transduction
Sources:Amigo / QuickGO
Orthologs
Databases	NCBI: entry; OMA: entry
Species	Human	Mouse
Entrez	27036	83382
Ensembl	ENSG00000168995	ENSMUSG00000030474
UniProt	Q9Y286	Q91Y57
RefSeq (mRNA)	NM_001277201; NM_014385; NM_016543	NM_031181
RefSeq (protein)	NP_001264130; NP_055200; NP_057627	NP_112458
Location (UCSC)	Chr 19: 51.14 – 51.15 Mb	Chr 7: 43.3 – 43.31 Mb
PubMed search
- Wikidata
View/Edit Human	View/Edit Mouse

Sialic acid-binding Ig-like lectin 7 is a protein that in humans is encoded by the SIGLEC7 gene. SIGLEC7 has also been designated as CD328 (cluster of differentiation 328).
