= Delta-like 1 =

Protein found in humans

DLL1
Available structures
PDB	Ortholog search: PDBe RCSB
PDB	List of PDB id codes 4XBM

Identifiers
- Aliases: DLL1, DELTA1, DL1, Delta, Delta-like 1, delta like canonical Notch ligand 1, NEDBAS
- External IDs: OMIM: 606582; MGI: 104659; HomoloGene: 4104; GeneCards: DLL1; OMA:DLL1 - orthologs

Gene location (Human)
Chr.	Chromosome 6 (human)
Band	6q27	Start	170,282,206 bp
Band	6q27	End	170,306,565 bp

Gene location (Mouse)
Chr.	Chromosome 17 (mouse)
Band	17 A2|17 8.95 cM	Start	15,587,616 bp
Band	17 A2|17 8.95 cM	End	15,597,134 bp
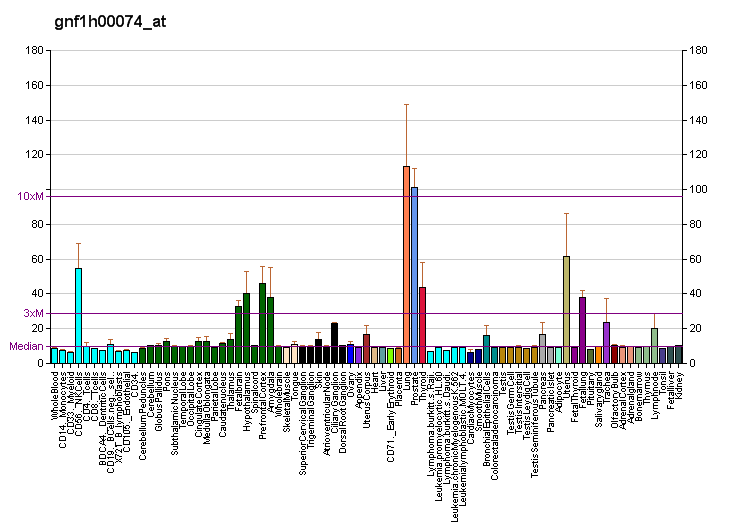
RNA expression pattern
Bgee	Human / Mouse (ortholog); Top expressed in: spleen; ventricular zone; skin of abdomen; skin of leg; prostate; apex of heart; mucosa of esophagus; vagina; right auricle of heart; minor salivary glands / Top expressed in: paraxial mesoderm; tail of embryo; ventricular zone; primitive streak; ciliary body; tongue muscle; corneal stroma; ganglionic eminence; medial ganglionic eminence; right lung; More reference expression data
BioGPS	More reference expression data
Gene ontology
Molecular function	calcium ion binding; scaffold protein binding; Tat protein binding; Notch binding; protein binding
Cellular component	integral component of membrane; membrane; adherens junction; plasma membrane; integral component of plasma membrane; extracellular region; cell junction; apical plasma membrane; membrane raft; cytoplasmic vesicle
Biological process	Notch signaling pathway; somitogenesis; negative regulation of interleukin-10 production; proximal/distal pattern formation; cell differentiation; negative regulation of myoblast differentiation; organ growth; regulation of somitogenesis; regulation of cell division; negative regulation of neuron differentiation; loop of Henle development; negative regulation of inner ear auditory receptor cell differentiation; astrocyte development; somite specification; negative regulation of glial cell apoptotic process; negative regulation of cell differentiation; neuron fate specification; endothelial tip cell fate specification; cell-cell signaling; regulation of skeletal muscle tissue growth; marginal zone B cell differentiation; skeletal muscle tissue growth; lateral inhibition; regulation of vascular endothelial growth factor signaling pathway; neuronal stem cell population maintenance; positive regulation of sprouting angiogenesis; regulation of blood pressure; heart looping; cerebellar molecular layer formation; cell communication; positive regulation of endocytosis; retina morphogenesis in camera-type eye; proximal tubule development; negative regulation of epidermal cell differentiation; clathrin-dependent endocytosis; determination of left/right symmetry; regulation of cell adhesion; cerebellar Purkinje cell layer structural organization; compartment pattern specification; positive regulation of gene expression; retina development in camera-type eye; skin epidermis development; positive regulation of cell population proliferation; nephron development; spinal cord development; cell fate determination; inner ear development; multicellular organism development; regulation of growth; Notch signaling pathway involved in arterial endothelial cell fate commitment; type B pancreatic cell development; negative regulation of epithelial cell differentiation; negative regulation of myeloid cell differentiation; positive regulation of skeletal muscle tissue growth; regulation of neurogenesis; left/right axis specification; positive regulation of Notch signaling pathway; negative regulation of cell population proliferation; positive regulation of transcription by RNA polymerase II; negative regulation of cardiac muscle cell differentiation; hemopoiesis; energy homeostasis
Sources:Amigo / QuickGO
Orthologs
Species	Human	Mouse
Entrez	28514	13388
Ensembl	ENSG00000275555; ENSG00000198719	ENSMUSG00000014773
UniProt	O00548	Q61483
RefSeq (mRNA)	NM_005618	NM_007865; NM_001379042
RefSeq (protein)	NP_005609	NP_031891; NP_001365971
Location (UCSC)	Chr 6: 170.28 – 170.31 Mb	Chr 17: 15.59 – 15.6 Mb
PubMed search
- Wikidata
View/Edit Human	View/Edit Mouse

Delta-like protein 1 is a protein that in humans is encoded by the DLL1 gene.

== Function ==
DLL1 is a human homolog of the Notch Delta ligand and is a member of the delta/serrate/jagged family. It plays a role in mediating cell fate decisions during hematopoiesis. It may play a role in cell-to-cell communication.

== Interactions ==
Delta-like 1 has been shown to interact with NOTCH2.
