= SIGLEC9 =

Protein-coding gene in the species Homo sapiens

Identifiers
- Aliases: SIGLEC9, CD329, CDw329, FOAP-9, OBBP-LIKE, siglec-9, sialic acid binding Ig like lectin 9
- External IDs: OMIM: 605640; MGI: 1932475; GeneCards: SIGLEC9

Gene location (Human)
| Chr. | Chromosome 19 (human) |
| Band | 19q13.41 | Start | 51,124,906 bp |
| Band | 19q13.41 | End | 51,136,651 bp |

Gene location (Mouse)
| Chr. | Chromosome 7 (mouse) |
| Band | 7 B3|7 | Start | 43,300,494 bp |
| Band | 7 B3|7 | End | 43,309,585 bp |
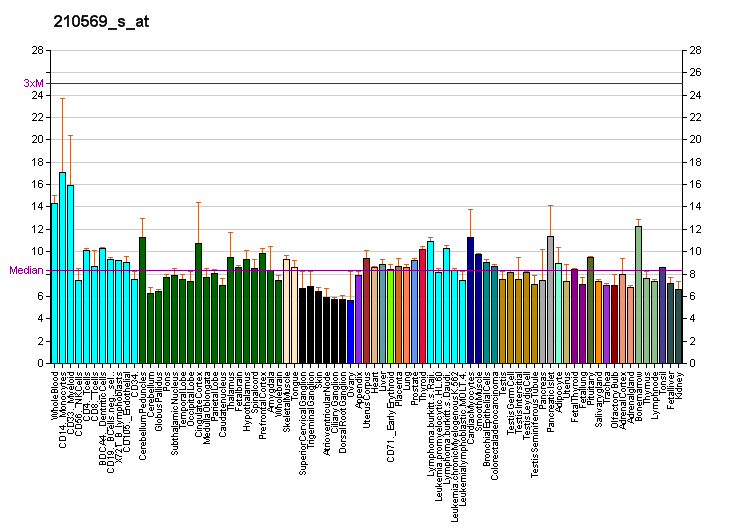
RNA expression pattern
| Bgee | Human / Mouse (ortholog); Top expressed in: monocyte; granulocyte; blood; spleen; upper lobe of left lung; gonad; right adrenal cortex; appendix; right lung; left adrenal gland / Top expressed in: granulocyte; zygote; secondary oocyte; spleen; blood; embryo; embryo; right kidney; bone marrow; primary oocyte; More reference expression data |
| BioGPS | More reference expression data |
Gene ontology
| Molecular function | carbohydrate binding; protein binding |
| Cellular component | integral component of membrane; plasma membrane; integral component of plasma membrane; membrane; secretory granule membrane |
| Biological process | cell surface receptor signaling pathway; cell adhesion; regulation of immune response; neutrophil degranulation |
Sources:Amigo / QuickGO
Orthologs
| Databases | NCBI: entry; OMA: entry |
| Species | Human | Mouse |
| Entrez | 27180 | 83382 |
| Ensembl | ENSG00000129450 | ENSMUSG00000030474 |
| UniProt | Q9Y336 | Q91Y57 |
| RefSeq (mRNA) | NM_001198558; NM_014441 | NM_031181 |
| RefSeq (protein) | NP_001185487; NP_055256 | NP_112458 |
| Location (UCSC) | Chr 19: 51.12 – 51.14 Mb | Chr 7: 43.3 – 43.31 Mb |
| PubMed search |
- Wikidata
| View/Edit Human | View/Edit Mouse |

Sialic acid-binding Ig-like lectin 9 is a protein that in humans is encoded by the SIGLEC9 gene.
