= Programmed cell death protein 1 =

Mammalian protein found in humans

PDCD1
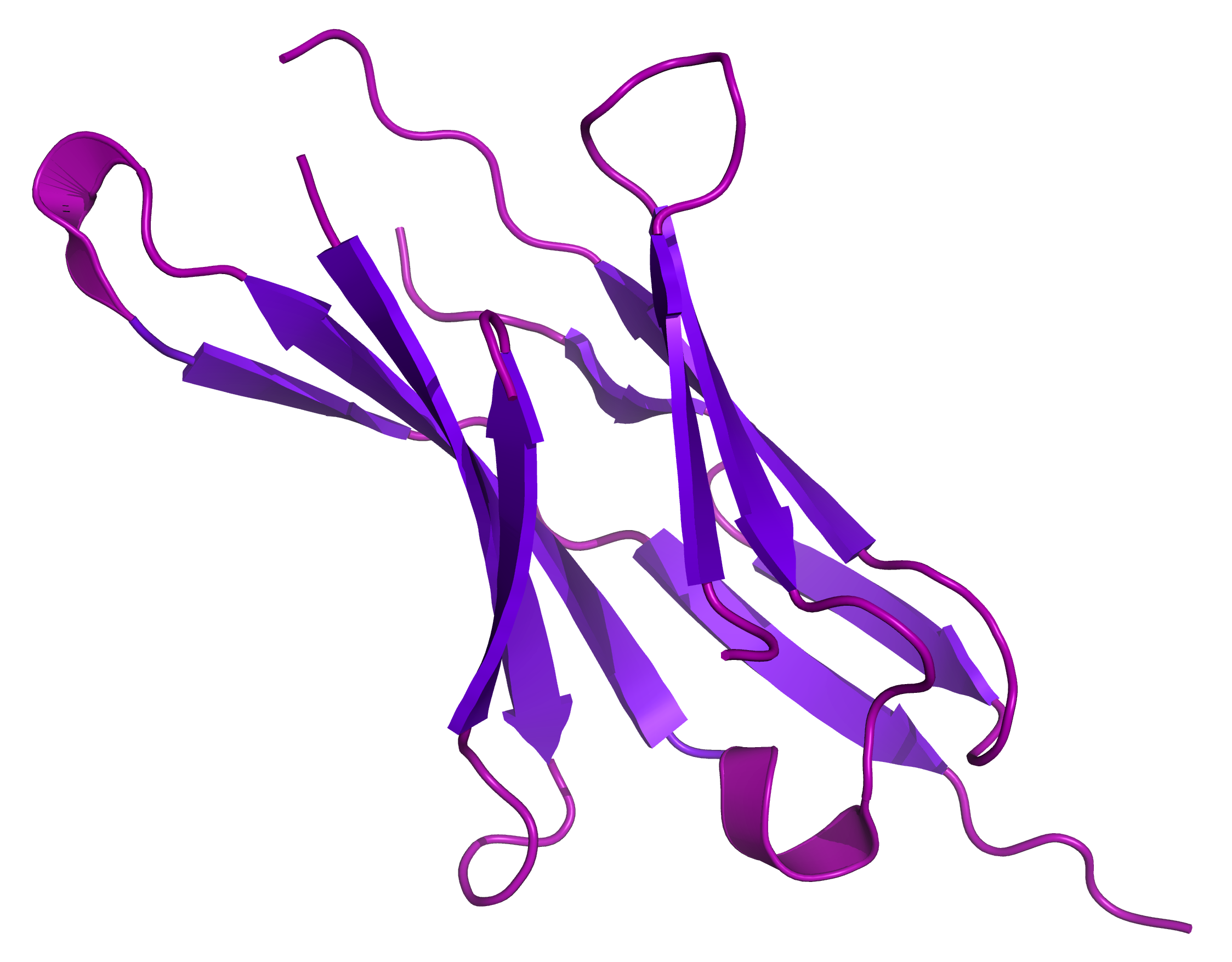

Identifiers
- Aliases: PDCD1, CD279, PD-1, PD1, SLEB2, hPD-1, hPD-l, hSLE1, Programmed cell death 1
- External IDs: OMIM: 600244; MGI: 104879; GeneCards: PDCD1
Available structures
PDB	Ortholog search: PDBe RCSB
PDB	List of PDB id codes 2M2D, 3RRQ, 4ZQK

Gene location (Human)
Chr.	Chromosome 2 (human)
Band	2q37.3	Start	241,849,884 bp
Band	2q37.3	End	241,858,894 bp

Gene location (Mouse)
Chr.	Chromosome 1 (mouse)
Band	1|1 D	Start	93,966,027 bp
Band	1|1 D	End	93,980,278 bp
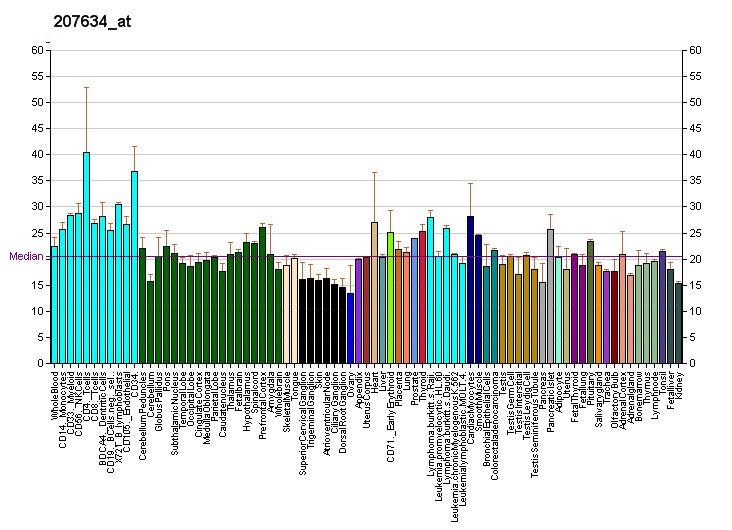
RNA expression pattern
Bgee	Human / Mouse (ortholog); Top expressed in: lymph node; granulocyte; spleen; right auricle of heart; appendix; blood; left ventricle; mucosa of transverse colon; upper lobe of left lung; tonsil / Top expressed in: embryo; thymus; embryo; mesenteric lymph nodes; zygote; cumulus cell; primary oocyte; spleen; blood; ovary; More reference expression data
BioGPS	More reference expression data
Gene ontology
Molecular function	protein binding; signal transducer activity
Cellular component	integral component of membrane; plasma membrane; membrane; external side of plasma membrane
Biological process	positive regulation of apoptotic process; multicellular organism development; T cell costimulation; negative regulation of apoptotic process; positive regulation of T cell apoptotic process; humoral immune response; negative regulation of tolerance induction; immune system process; apoptotic process; signal transduction
Sources:Amigo / QuickGO
Orthologs
Databases	NCBI: entry; OMA: entry
Species	Human	Mouse
Entrez	5133	18566
Ensembl	ENSG00000188389; ENSG00000276977	ENSMUSG00000026285
UniProt	Q15116	Q02242
RefSeq (mRNA)	NM_005018	NM_008798
RefSeq (protein)	NP_005009	NP_032824
Location (UCSC)	Chr 2: 241.85 – 241.86 Mb	Chr 1: 93.97 – 93.98 Mb
PubMed search
- Wikidata
View/Edit Human	View/Edit Mouse

Programmed cell death protein 1 (PD-1) (CD279 cluster of differentiation 279) is a protein encoded in humans by the PDCD1 gene. PD-1 is a cell surface receptor on T cells and B cells that has a role in regulating the immune system's response to the cells of the human body by down-regulating the immune system and promoting self-tolerance by suppressing T cell inflammatory activity. This prevents autoimmune diseases, but it can also prevent the immune system from killing cancer cells.

PD-1 is an immune checkpoint and guards against autoimmunity through two mechanisms. First, it promotes apoptosis (programmed cell death) of antigen-specific T-cells in lymph nodes. Second, it reduces apoptosis in regulatory T cells (anti-inflammatory, suppressive T cells).

PD-1 inhibitors, a new class of drugs that block PD-1, activate the immune system to attack tumors and are used to treat certain types of cancer.

PD-1 is a cell surface receptor that belongs to the immunoglobulin superfamily and is expressed on T cells and pro-B cells. PD-1 binds two ligands, PD-L1 and PD-L2.

== Discovery ==
In a screen for genes involved in apoptosis, Yasumasa Ishida, Tasuku Honjo and colleagues at Kyoto University in 1992 discovered and named PD-1. In 1999, the same group demonstrated that mice where PD-1 was knocked down were prone to autoimmune disease and hence concluded that PD-1 was a negative regulator of immune responses.

In 2025, Yasumasa Ishida was part of a group that found that PD-1, together with its extracellular ligand "PD-L1" (the name given to the single gene precursor of both PD-L1 and PD-L2 genes in tetrapod species) and cytoplasmic tail binding phosphatases SHP-1 and SHP-2, and their interaction motifs, are well-conserved in evolution throughout jawed vertebrates (from the level of sharks) (Figure 2). This corroborated partial findings by others.

== Structure ==
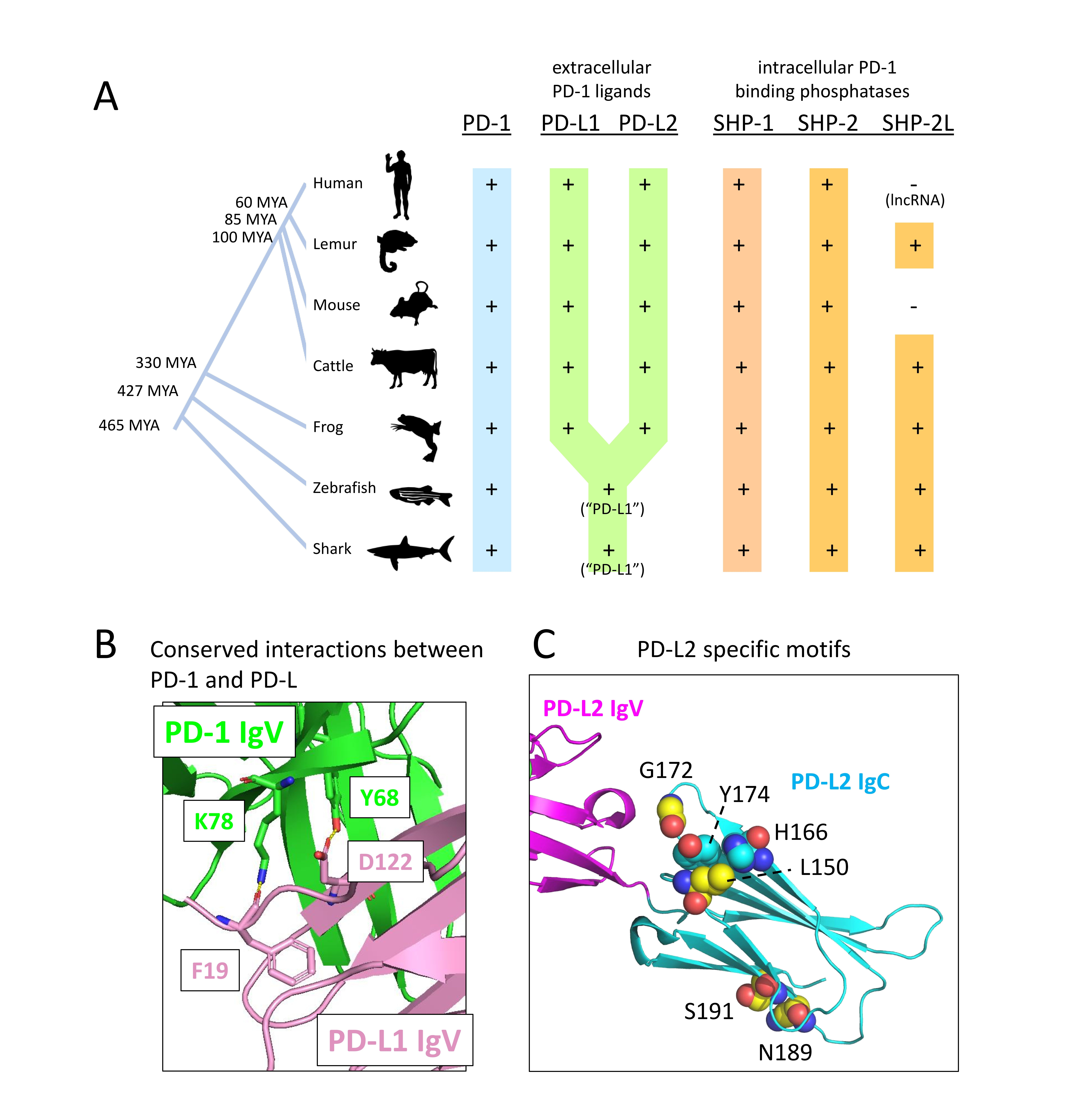
Figure 2. Evolution of PD-1 and its interacting molecules

PD-1 is a type I membrane protein of 288 amino acids. PD-1 is a member of the extended CD28/CTLA-4 family of T cell regulators. The protein's structure includes an extracellular IgV domain followed by a transmembrane region and an intracellular tail. The intracellular tail contains two phosphorylation sites located in an immunoreceptor tyrosine-based inhibitory motif and an immunoreceptor tyrosine-based switch motif, which suggests that PD-1 negatively regulates T-cell receptor TCR signals. This is consistent with binding of SHP-1 and SHP-2 phosphatases to the cytoplasmic tail of PD-1 upon ligand binding. In addition, PD-1 ligation up-regulates E3 ubiquitin ligases CBL-b and c-CBL that trigger T cell receptor down-modulation. PD-1 is expressed on the surface of activated T cells, B cells, and macrophages, suggesting that compared to CTLA-4, PD-1 more broadly negatively regulates immune responses.

== Ligands ==
PD-1 has two ligands, PD-L1 and PD-L2, which are members of the B7 family. PD-L1 protein is upregulated on macrophages and dendritic cells (DC) in response to LPS and GM-CSF treatment, and on T cells and B cells upon TCR and B cell receptor signaling, whereas in resting mice, PD-L1 mRNA can be detected in the heart, lung, thymus, spleen, and kidney. PD-L1 is expressed on almost all murine tumor cell lines, including PA1 myeloma, P815 mastocytoma, and B16 melanoma upon treatment with IFN-γ. PD-L2 expression is more restricted and is expressed mainly by DCs and a few tumor lines.

== Function ==
Several lines of evidence suggest that PD-1 and its ligands negatively regulate immune responses. PD-1 knockout mice have been shown to develop lupus-like glomerulonephritis and dilated cardiomyopathy on the C57BL/6 and BALB/c backgrounds, respectively. In vitro, treatment of anti-CD3 stimulated T cells with PD-L1-Ig results in reduced T cell proliferation and IFN-γ secretion. IFN-γ is a key pro-inflammatory cytokine that promotes T cell inflammatory activity. Reduced T cell proliferation was also correlated with attenuated IL-2 secretion and together, these data suggest that PD-1 negatively regulates T cell responses.

Experiments using PD-L1 transfected DCs and PD-1 expressing transgenic (Tg) CD4^{+} and CD8^{+} T cells suggest that CD8^{+} T cells are more susceptible to inhibition by PD-L1, although this could be dependent on the strength of TCR signaling. Consistent with a role in negatively regulating CD8^{+} T cell responses, using an LCMV viral vector model of chronic infection, Rafi Ahmed's group showed that the PD-1-PD-L1 interaction inhibits activation, expansion and acquisition of effector functions of virus specific CD8^{+} T cells, which can be reversed by blocking the PD-1-PD-L1 interaction.

Expression of PD-L1 on tumor cells inhibits anti-tumor activity through engagement of PD-1 on effector T cells. Expression of PD-L1 on tumors is correlated with reduced survival in esophageal, pancreatic and other types of cancers, highlighting this pathway as a target for immunotherapy. Triggering PD-1, expressed on monocytes and up-regulated upon monocytes activation, by its ligand PD-L1 induces IL-10 production which inhibits CD4 T-cell function.

In mice, expression of this gene is induced in the thymus when anti-CD3 antibodies are injected and large numbers of thymocytes undergo apoptosis. Mice deficient for this gene bred on a BALB/c background developed dilated cardiomyopathy and died from congestive heart failure. These studies suggest that this gene product may also be important in T cell function and contribute to the prevention of autoimmune diseases.

Overexpression of PD1 on CD8+ T cells is one of the indicators of T-cell exhaustion (e.g. in chronic infection or cancer).

== Clinical significance ==
=== Cancer ===
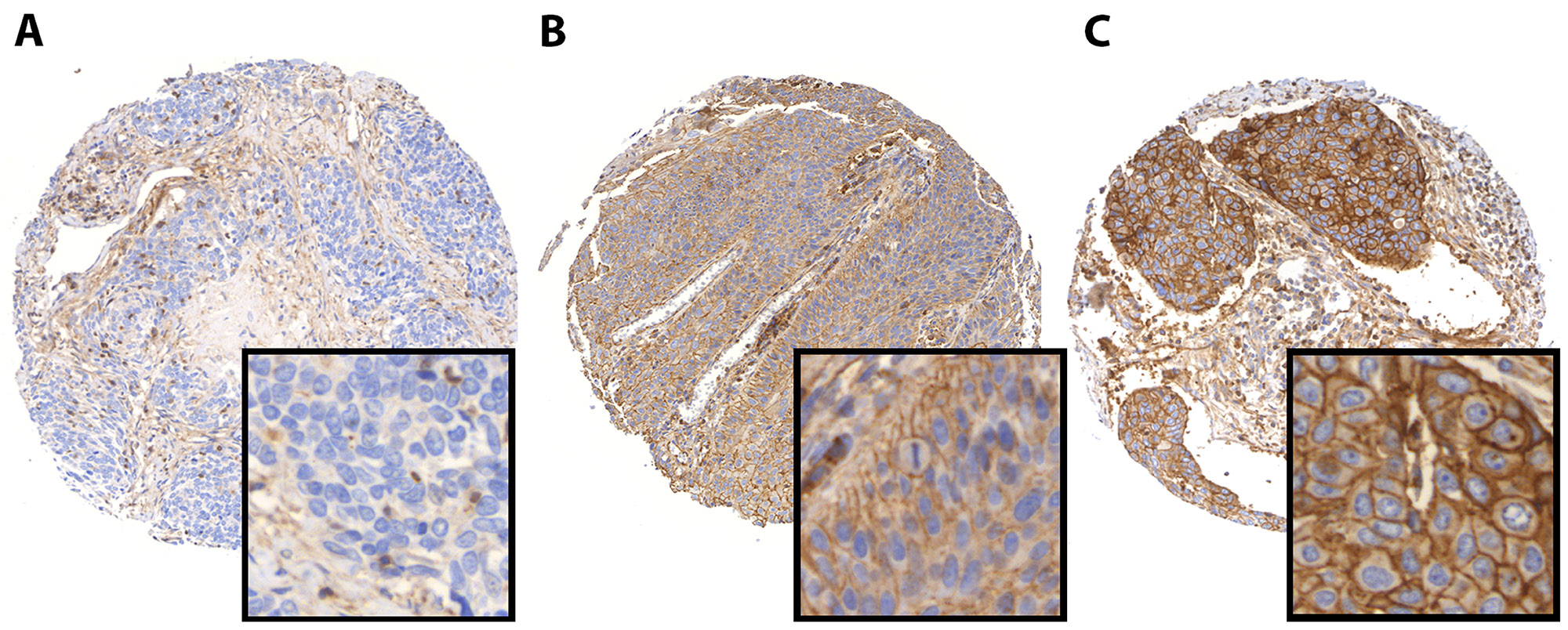
PD-L1 expression by chromogenic immunohistochemistry in cases of head and neck squamous cell carcinoma, demonstrating negative (A), low (B), and high (C) PD-L1 protein levels

PD-L1, an immunosuppressive PD-1 ligand, is highly expressed in several cancers; the role of PD-1 in cancer immune evasion is well established. Monoclonal antibodies targeting PD-1 that boost the immune system are being developed for the treatment of cancer. Inhibition of the interaction between PD-1 and PD-L1 can enhance T-cell responses in vitro and mediate preclinical antitumor activity. This is known as immune checkpoint blockade.

PD-1 is expressed intrinsically in some tumor cells, such as melanoma, where it promotes tumor growth independently of the immune system. Inhibition of tumor cell-intrinsic PD-1 suppresses tumor growth, whereas overexpression or engagement by PD-L1 enhances tumorigenicity.

Combination therapy using both anti-PD1 along with anti-CTLA4 therapeutics have emerged as important tumor treatments within the field of checkpoint inhibition. The effects of the two antibodies has been shown to be more effective than either antibody alone and does not appear to be redundant. Anti-CTLA4 treatment leads to an enhanced antigen specific T cell dependent immune reaction while anti-PD-1 appears to reactivate CD8+ T cells ability to lyse cancer cells.

In clinical trials, combination therapy has been shown to be effective in reducing tumor size in patients that are unresponsive to single co-inhibitory blockade, despite increasing levels of toxicity due to anti-CTLA4 treatment. A combination of PD1 and CTLA4 induced up to a ten-fold higher number of CD8+ T cells that are actively infiltrating the tumor tissue. The authors hypothesized that the higher levels of CD8+ T cell infiltration was due to anti-CTLA-4 inhibited the conversion of CD4 T cells to T regulator cells and further reduced T regulatory suppression with anti-PD-1. This combination promoted a more robust inflammatory response to the tumor that reduced the size of the cancer. Most recently, the FDA has approved a combination therapy with both anti-CTLA4 (ipilimumab) and anti-PD1 (nivolumab) in October 2015.

The molecular factors and receptors necessary making a tumor receptive to anti-PD1 treatment remains unknown. PD-L1 expression on the surface on cancer cells plays a significant role. PD-L1 positive tumors were twice as likely to respond to combination treatment. However patients with PD-L1 negative tumors also have limited response to anti-PD1, demonstrating that PD-L1 expression is not an absolute determinant of the effectiveness of therapy.

Higher mutational burden in the tumor is correlated with a greater effect of the anti-PD-1 treatment. In clinical trials, patients who benefited from anti-PD1 treatment had cancers, such as melanoma, bladder cancer, and gastric cancer, that had a median higher average number of mutations than the patients who did not respond to the therapy. However, the correlation between higher tumor burden and the clinical effectiveness of PD-1 immune blockade is still uncertain.

The 2018 Nobel Prize for Medicine was awarded to James P Allison and Tasuku Honjo "for their discovery of cancer therapy by inhibition of negative immune regulation".

=== Anti-PD-1 therapeutics ===
A number of cancer immunotherapy agents that target the PD-1 receptor have been developed.

One such anti-PD-1 antibody drug, nivolumab, (Opdivo - Bristol Myers Squibb), produced complete or partial responses in non-small-cell lung cancer, melanoma, and renal-cell cancer, in a clinical trial with a total of 296 patients. Colon and pancreatic cancer did not have a response. Nivolumab (Opdivo, Bristol-Myers Squibb) was approved in Japan in July 2014 and by the US FDA in December 2014 to treat metastatic melanoma.

Pembrolizumab (Keytruda, MK-3475, Merck), which also targets PD-1 receptors, was approved by the FDA in Sept 2014 to treat metastatic melanoma. Pembrolizumab has been made accessible to advanced melanoma patients in the UK via UK Early Access to Medicines Scheme (EAMS) in March 2015. It is being used in clinical trials in the US for lung cancer, lymphoma, and mesothelioma. It has had measured success, with little side effects. It is up to the manufacturer of the drug to submit application to the FDA for approval for use in these diseases. On October 2, 2015, Pembrolizumab was approved by FDA for advanced (metastatic) non-small cell lung cancer (NSCLC) patients whose disease has progressed after other treatments.

Toripalimab is a humanized IgG4 monoclonal antibody against PD-1 which was approved in China in 2018 and in the United States in 2023.

Serplulimab (Hetronifly, HANSIZHUANG, HLX10) is a novel anti-PD-1 monoclonal antibody approved for medical use in China in 2022. It has been approved by the National Medical Products Administration (NMPA) for the treatment of squamous non-small cell lung cancer (sqNSCLC), extensive-stage small cell lung cancer (ES-SCLC), esophageal squamous cell carcinoma (ESCC) in patients with PD-L1 expression (CPS ≥ 1), non-squamous non-small cell lung cancer (nsqNSCLC) and gastric cancer (GC), making it the world’s first anti-PD-1 mAb for the first-line treatment of SCLC and for the treatment of perioperative gastric cancer.

Serplulimab was approved by the European Commission in February 2025, in combination with carboplatin and etoposide, for first-line treatment of extensive-stage small cell lung cancer. Further European Commission approvals followed in May 2026 for non-squamous non-small cell lung cancer and esophageal squamous cell carcinoma, and in June 2026 for squamous non-small cell lung cancer.

Drugs in early stage development targeting PD-1 receptors (checkpoint inhibitors) include pidilizumab (CT-011, Cure Tech) and BMS-936559 (Bristol Myers Squibb). Both atezolizumab (MPDL3280A, Roche) and avelumab (Merck KGaA, Darmstadt, Germany and Pfizer) target the similar PD-L1 receptor.

== Animal studies ==
=== HIV ===
Drugs targeting PD-1 in combination with other negative immune checkpoint receptors, such as (TIGIT), may augment immune responses and/or facilitate HIV eradication. T lymphocytes exhibit elevated expression of PD-1 in cases of chronic HIV infection. Heightened presence of the PD-1 receptors corresponds to exhaustion of the HIV specific CD8+ cytotoxic and CD4+ helper T cell populations that are vital in combating the virus. Immune blockade of PD-1 resulted in restoration of T cell inflammatory phenotype necessary to combat the progression of disease.

=== Alzheimer's disease ===
Blocking of PD-1 leads to a reduction in cerebral amyloid-β plaques and improves cognitive performance in mice. Immune blockade of PD-1 evoked an IFN-γ dependent immune response that recruited monocyte-derived macrophages to the brain that were then capable of clearing the amyloid-β plaques from the tissue. Repeated administrations with anti-PD-1 were found to be necessary to maintain the therapeutic effects of the treatment. Amyloid fibrils are immunosuppressive and this finding has been separately confirmed by examining the effects of the fibrils in neuroinflammatory diseases. PD-1 counteracts the effects of the fibrils by boosting immune activity and triggering an immune pathway that allows for brain repair.
