= TOL101 =

Monoclonal antibody

Monoclonal antibody
- Type: Whole antibody
- Source: Mouse
- Target: αβ T Cell Receptor

Clinical data
- Routes of administration: Intravenous

Legal status
- Legal status: US: Investigational New Drug (Renal Transplantation)

Identifiers
- CAS Number: 0113923AB
- ChemSpider: none
- UNII: 28X0AGG6P8

TOL101 is a murine-monoclonal antibody specific for the human αβ T cell receptor. In 2010 it was an Investigational New Drug under development by Tolera Therapeutics, Inc.

== Clinical progress ==
TOL101 is a clinical stage investigational drug. The safety and efficacy of TOL101 was the focus of a phase 2 clinical trial in renal transplant patients in 2010.

== Orphan drug status ==
TOL101 was granted "orphan drug" status by the U.S. Food and Drug Administration for the treatment of recent onset immune-mediated Type 1 diabetes and for prophylaxis of acute rejection of solid organ transplantation.

== Rationale for development ==
There are multiple agents currently under investigation that are capable of modulating T cells. Currently used agents include anti-thymocyte globulin (ATG) and alemtuzumab, which not only affect T cells, but are also capable of modulating multiple other aspects of the immune system, often resulting in long-term broad spectrum immune suppression. Antibodies specific for CD3 such as teplizumab and otelixizumab show increased specificity for T cells compared to ATG and alemtuzumab, but are still associated with infection and cytokine release syndrome. Targeting the αβ T cells with TOL101 may reduce these issues through two mechanisms. First, infections are expected to be reduced through the preservation of γδ T cells, which have been shown to play an important role in controlling viruses such as cytomegalovirus (CMV), often observed in antibody treated patients. Second, reductions in cytokine release are expected when targeting the αβ TCR because, unlike CD3 proteins, the αβ TCR contains none of the immunoreceptor tyrosine-based activation motifs (ITAMS) required for T cell activation.

== Mechanism of action ==
=== TOL101 modulates αβ T cells ===
TOL101 has been shown in in vitro models to specifically modulate αβ T cells. Incubation of peripheral blood monocytes (PBMC) with TOL101 triggers rapid down modulation of the T cell receptor. Importantly, this occurs without T cell proliferation or cytokine induction. Examination of the ability of TOL101 to modulate T cells in a humanized mouse model not only confirmed these in vitro results but also suggested that the T cell modulating capability of the drug occurred in a non-depletional fashion.

=== αβ T cells antibodies in experimental disease models ===
Targeting αβ T cells with antibodies has been tested in a number of experimental models of disease. The data suggests that in models of multiple sclerosis (Experimental autoimmune encephalomyelitis) and type 1 diabetes (Non-obese diabetic mice,) anti-αβ TCR antibody therapy can ameliorate disease symptoms and progression. The precise mechanism through which this occurs remains to be defined, however, it is likely to involve the induction of operational tolerance.

== Chemistry ==
TOL101 is a murine IgM antibody.
