= Foralumab =

Monoclonal antibody

Monoclonal antibody
- Type: Whole antibody
- Source: Human
- Target: CD3 epsilon

Clinical data
- ATC code: none

Identifiers
- CAS Number: 946415-64-1
- ChemSpider: none
- UNII: J43DL56H6M

Foralumab (TZLS-401), being researched by Tiziana Life Sciences) is a fully human monoclonal antibody that binds to CD3 epsilon of the T cell receptor-CD3 complex. It is currently being studied in a randomized, double-blind placebo-controlled, multicenter dose-ranging study in a nasal formulation in patients with non-active secondary progressive multiple sclerosis (SPMS).

== Clinical research ==
=== Nasal administration ===
==== Phase 1 ====
Nasal foralumab was studied at the Brigham and Women's Hospital, at the Ann Romney Center. Twenty-seven (9 per group) healthy volunteers received either nasal foralumab (10ug, 50ug, or 250ug daily for 5 days) or they received nasal placebo. Nasal foralumab induced CD8+ Regulatory T cells and reduced CD4+ Suppressor T Cells. Foralumab induced LAP, TIGIT, and KLRG1 immune checkpoint molecules. The treatment was well tolerated by all subjects. The researchers concluded that the Immune effects of nasal foralumab were optimal at the 50ug dose.

==== Phase 2 - Non-active secondary progressive - Multiple sclerosis ====
Nasal foralumab is currently being studied in the United States in a randomized, double-blind placebo-controlled, multicenter dose-ranging study in a nasal formulation in patients with non-active secondary progressive multiple sclerosis (SPMS). The two primary outcome measures are 1) To determine the safety and tolerability of 50 μg/dose and 100 μg/dose of foralumab nasal compared to placebo and 2) To investigate the effect of foralumab relative to placebo on the change from baseline [18F]PBR06-positron emission tomography (PET) scans for microglial activation, after 12 weeks (3) months of study treatment.

===== Phase 2 - Non-active secondary progressive - Alzheimer's disease =====
Dr. Howard Weiner announced that nasal foralumab has been cleared by the FDA to be studied in a 6 month phase 2 trial to assess safety, cognition and reduction in microglia PET imaging. In late 2024 the first subject began treatment under this program. PET scans demonstrate reduction in inflammation of the brain. It is not yet clear whether this will be associated with symptomatic improvement.

===== Phase 2 - COVID-19 =====
Nasal foralumab was studied in 39 patients with mild to moderate COVID-19. They were randomized into 1) Control {standard of care plus a placebo}, 2) 100 μg/dose of nasal foralumab and 3) 100 μg/dose of nasal foralumab plus dexamethasone. Both nasal foralumab alone and nasal foralumab combined with dexamethasone demonstrated more rapid clearance of lung infiltrates as measured by chest CT compared to the control group.

=== Intravenous administration ===
==== Phase 1 - Crohn's disease ====
Intravenous foralumab was studied in 39 patients with confirmed active Crohn's disease of at least 6 months duration. The patients were given intravenous infusion daily for 5 days. This limited study did not show efficacy.
