= ITAM =

ITAM may refer to:

- Instituto Tecnológico Autónomo de México, a private research university located in Mexico City, Mexico
- IT asset management
- Immunoreceptor tyrosine-based activation motif
