= Tolerx =

American biopharmaceutical company

Tolerx, Inc.
- Company type: Private
- Industry: Biotechnology
- Founded: 2000
- Headquarters: Cambridge, Massachusetts
- Website: http://www.tolerx.com/

Tolerx, Inc. was a biopharmaceutical company headquartered in Cambridge, Massachusetts. The company was focused on discovering and developing new therapies designed to treat patients by reprogramming the immune system, allowing for long-term remission of immune-related diseases after a short course of therapy. Targeted diseases include type 1 diabetes, rheumatoid arthritis, Inflammatory bowel disease (IBD), cancer, chronic and viral diseases. In 2008, Tolerx was named one of Fierce Biotech’s Fierce 15. In October 2011, Tolerx was shut down due to an unsuccessful Phase III trial in patients recently diagnosed with Type 1 diabetes.

== Development programs ==
Tolerx’s lead product candidate, otelixizumab, also known as TRX4, is a novel monoclonal antibody being developed for the treatment of autoimmune type 1 diabetes and other autoimmune diseases. The efficacy and safety of otelixizumab in the treatment of type 1 diabetes is currently being studied in a pivotal Phase 3 study called DEFEND (Durable-response therapy Evaluation For Early or New-onset type 1 Diabetes). Tolerx entered into a collaboration with Glaxo SmithKline in October 2007 relating to the development and commercialization of otelixizumab. Otelixizumab has been granted Orphan Drug Status by the U.S. Food and Drug Administration.

Additionally, in collaboration with Genentech, Tolerx is developing a modified version of TRX1, a humanized monoclonal antibody that binds to the CD4 receptor found on both T effector and T regulatory cells. The safety and activity of TRX1 was evaluated by Tolerx in a single-dose, placebo-controlled, double-blind Phase 1 clinical trial. The data from the Phase 1 clinical trial showed TRX1 was well tolerated, did not deplete T cells, and had no observed first-dose side effect. The modified version of TRX1, designated MTRX1011A, is being developed for the treatment of autoimmune diseases, which may include rheumatoid arthritis, cutaneous lupus erythematosus (CLE), multiple sclerosis (MS), and systemic lupus erythematosus (SLE).

== Leadership ==
Herman Waldmann, PhD, FRCPath, MRCP, FRS, FMedSci, Co-Founder, Chairman, Scientific Advisory Board, Professor of Pathology, Head of the Sir William Dunn School of Pathology and Clinical Director of the Therapeutic Antibody Centre (TAC), University of Oxford

“A pioneer in the field of monoclonal antibody production”

Douglas J. Ringler, VMD, Co-Founder, President & CEO

Louis Vaickus, MD Chief Medical Officer

Thomas A. Shea, MBA Chief Financial Officer
