= CD4+ T cells and antitumor immunity =

Understanding of the antitumor immunity role of CD4^{+} T cells has grown substantially since the late 1990s. CD4^{+} T cells (mature T-helper cells) play an important role in modulating immune responses to pathogens and tumor cells, and are important in orchestrating overall immune responses.

== Immunosurveillance and immunoediting ==
This discovery furthered the development of a previously hypothesized theory, the immunosurveillance theory. The immunosurveillance theory suggests that the immune system routinely patrols the cells of the body, and, upon recognition of a cell, or group of cells, that has become cancerous, it will attempt to destroy them, thus preventing the growth of some tumors. (Burnet, 1970) More recent evidence has suggested that immunosurveillance is only part of a larger role the immune system plays in fighting cancer. Remodeling of this theory has led to the progression of the immunoediting theory, in which there are 3 phases, Elimination, Equilibrium and Escape.

=== Elimination phase ===
As mentioned, the elimination phase is synonymous with the classic immunosurveillance theory.

In 2001, it was shown that mice deficient in RAG-2 (Recombinase Activator Gene 2) were far less capable of preventing MCA induced tumours than were wild type mice. (Shankaran et al., 2001, Bui and Schreiber, 2007) RAG proteins are necessary for the recombination events necessary to produce TCRs and Igs, and as such RAG-2 deficient mice are incapable of producing functional T, B or NK cells. RAG-2 deficient mice were chosen over other methods of inducting immunodeficiency (such as SCID mice) as an absence of these proteins does not affect DNA repair mechanisms, which becomes important when dealing with cancer, as DNA repair problems can lead to cancers themselves. This experiment provides clear evidence that the immune system does, in fact, play a role in eradication of tumor cells.

Further knock out experiments showed important roles of αβ T cells, γδ T cells and NK cells in tumour immunity (Girardi et al. 2001, Smyth et al., 2001)

Another experiment involving interferon gamma (IFNγ^{−/−}) showed that these mice are more likely to develop certain types of cancers as well, and suggests a role of CD4^{+} T cells in tumor immunity, which produce large amounts of IFNγ (Street et al., 2002)

Perforin deficient mice were also shown to have a reduced ability to ward off MCA induced cancers, suggesting an important role of CD8^{+} T cells. (Street et al. 2001) Perforin is a protein produced by CD8^{+} T cells, which plays a central role in the cytotoxic killing mechanisms by providing entry of degradative granzymes into an infected cell. (Abbas and Lichtman, 2005)

Finally, the innate immune system has also been associated with immunosurveillance (Dunn et al., 2004).

=== Equilibrium phase ===
The equilibrium phase of the immunoediting theory is characterized by the continued existence of the tumour, but little growth. Due to the extremely high rate of mutation of cancer cells, it is probable that many will escape the elimination phase, and progress into the equilibrium phase. There is currently little evidence to support the existence of an equilibrium phase, aside from the observation that cancers have been shown to lie dormant, i.e. to go into remission, in a person's body for years before re-emerging again in the final escape phase. It has been noted that tumors that persist in the equilibrium phase show reduced immunogenicity when compared to tumors which have been grown in immunodeficient mice (Shankaran et al., 2001) Three possible outcomes for tumors managing to evade the immune system, and reach the equilibrium phase have been proposed: 1) eventual elimination by the immune system 2) a prolonged or indefinite period of dormancy, or 3) progression into the final escape phase.

=== Escape phase ===
As the name implies, the escape phase is characterized by a reduced immunogenicity of the cancer cells, their subsequent evasion of the immune system and their ability to be clinically detected. A number of theories have been proposed to explain this phase of the theory.

Cancer cells, through mutation, may actually have mutations in some of the proteins involved in antigen presentation, and as such, evade an immune response. (Dunn et al., 2004) Tumor cells may, through mutations, often begin producing large quantities of inhibitory cytokines IL-10, or transforming growth factor β (TGF-β) (Khong and Restifo, 2002) thereby suppressing the immune system, allowing for large-scale proliferation (Salazar-Onfray et al., 2007). Also, it has been observed that some cancer patients exhibit higher than normal levels of CD4^{+}/CD25^{+} T cells, a subset of T cells often called regulatory T cells, for their known immunosuppressive actions. These T cells produce high levels of IL-10 and TGF-β, thereby suppressing the immune system and allowing for evasion by the tumor (Shimizu et al., 1999).

== Tumour antigens ==
Tumour antigens are those expressed by tumor cells, and recognizable as being different from self cells. Most currently classified tumor antigens are endogenously synthesized, and as such are presented on MHC class I molecules to CD8^{+} T cells. Such antigens include products of oncogenes or tumor suppressor genes, mutants of other cellular genes, products of genes that are normally silenced, over-expressed gene products, products of oncogenic viruses, oncofetal antigens (proteins normally expressed only during development of the fetus) glycolipids and glycoproteins. Detailed explanations of these tumor antigens can be found in Abbas and Lichtman, 2005. MHC class II restricted antigens currently remain somewhat obscure. Development of new techniques has been successful in identifying some of these antigens, however, additional research is required. (Wang, 2003)

== Antitumour immunity ==
Historically, much more attention and funding has been devoted to the role of CD8^{+} T cells in antitumor immunity, rather than to CD4^{+} T cells. This can be attributed to a number of things; CD4^{+} T cells respond only to presentation of antigens by MHC class II, however, most cells express only MHC class I; second, CD8^{+} T cells, upon being presented with antigen by MHC class I, can directly kill the cancerous cell, through mechanisms which will not be discussed in this article, but which have been well categorized; (See Abbas and Lichtman, 2005) finally, there is simply a more widespread understanding and knowledge of MHC class I tumor antigens, while MHC class II antigens remain somewhat obscure.(Pardol and Toplain, 1998).

It was believed that CD4^{+} T cells were not involved directly in antitumour immunity, but rather functioned simply in the priming of CD8^{+} T cells, through activation of antigen-presenting cells (APCs) and increased antigen presentation on MHC class I, as well as secretion of excitatory cytokines such as IL-2 (Pardol and Toplain, 1998, Kalams and Walker, 1998, Wang 2001).

== Controversial role in antitumor immunity ==
The role of CD4^{+} T cells in antitumor immunity is controversial. It was suggested that CD4^{+} T cells can have a direct role in antitumor immunity through direct recognition of tumor antigens presented on the surface of tumor cells in association with MHC class II molecules. Of note, results from recent reports suggest that direct recognition of tumors from tumor-antigen specific CD4^{+} T cells might not be always beneficial. For example, it was recently shown that CD4^{+} T cells primarily produce TNF after recognition of tumor-antigens in melanoma. TNF may in turn increase local immunosuppression and impair the effector functions of CD8 T cells (Donia M. et al., 2015).

== T_{h}1 and T_{h}2 CD4^{+}T cells ==
The same series of experiments, examining the role of CD4^{+} cells, showed that high levels of IL-4 and IFNγ were present at the site of the tumor, following vaccination, and subsequent tumour challenge. (Hung, 1998) IL-4 is the predominant cytokine produced by T_{h}2 cells, while IFNγ is the predominant T_{h}1 cytokine. Earlier work has shown that these two cytokines inhibit the production of each other by inhibiting differentiation down the opposite T_{h} pathway, in normal microbial infections (Abbas and Lichtman, 2005), yet here they were seen at nearly equal levels. Even more interesting was that both these cytokines were required for maximal tumor immunity, and that mice deficient in either showed greatly reduced antitumor immunity. IFN-γ null mice showed virtually no immunity, while IL-4 null mice showed a 50% reduction when compared to immunised wild type mice.

The reduction of immunity in IL-4 deficient mice, has been attributed to a decrease in eosinophil production. In mice deficient in IL-5, the cytokine responsible for differentiation of myeloid progenitor cells into eosinophils, less eosinophils are seen at the site of tumour challenge, which is to be expected. (Hung, 1998) These mice also show reduced antitumor immunity, suggesting that IL-4 deficient mice, which would produce less IL-5, and subsequently have reduced eosinophil levels, elicit their effect through eosinophils.

== T_{h}-1 activity in tumor immunity ==
T_{h}1 cells are one of the two main T_{h} cell polarizations first identified and involved in type 1 immunity. T_{h}1 differentiation is IL-12 dependent, and IFN-γ is the signature cytokine of cells of a T_{h}1 lineage.

T_{h}1 cell anti-tumor activity is complex and includes many mechanisms. T_{h}1 cells are indirectly responsible for activating tumor-suppressing CTLs by activating the antigen-presenting cells which then present antigen to and activate the CTL.

IFN-γ produced by T_{h}1 cells activates macrophages, increasing phagocytosis of pathogen and tumor cells. Activated macrophages produce IL-12, and since IL-12 promotes T_{h}1 cell differentiation, this forms a tumor-suppressing feedback loop.

T_{h}1 and NK cells both contribute to killing of tumor cells via the TNF-related apoptosis-inducing ligand (TRAIL) pathway. NK cells produce IFN-γ and are also activated by IL-12, creating another tumor-suppressing feedback loop.

== T_{h}-2 activity in tumor immunity ==
T_{h}2 cells are the other T_{h} cell polarization initially defined. T_{h}2 differentiation is dependent on the presence of IL-4 and the absence of IL-12, and signature cytokines (type 2 cytokines) of T_{h}2 cells include IL-4, IL-5, and IL-13. T_{h}2 cells are involved in type 2 immunity. Although it has traditionally been associated with tumor promotion, emerging evidence indicates a potential tumor-suppressive function highlighting a paradigm shift in our understanding about type 2 immunity in cancer.

T_{h}2 mediated anti-tumor activity primarily involves recruitment of eosinophils to the tumor environment type 2 cytokines, including IL-5. Anti-tumor eosinophil activity includes attraction of tumor-specific CTLs, activation of macrophages, and vascularization of the tumor stroma.

== T_{h}-17 activity in tumor immunity ==
T_{h}17 are a recently identified subset of T_{h} cells that are primarily involved in promoting inflammatory responses. T_{h}17 differentiation is induced by TGF-β and IL-6, and signature cytokines of T_{h}17 cells include IL-17A and IL-17F.

The mechanisms of T_{h}17 cell activity in the tumor microenvironment are not well understood. T_{h}17 cells can orchestrate chronic inflammatory responses, which tend to promote tumor growth and survival. In addition, some tumors have been shown to express high levels of IL-6 & TGF-β, which would reinforce a T_{h}17 polarization, creating a tumor-promoting feedback loop.

T_{h}17 cells have also been found to have the capacity to differentiate into IFN-γ secreting cells, thus suppressing tumor growth via IFN-γ-related pathways.

== Treg activity in tumor immunity ==
Regulatory T_{h} cells (Tregs) are another recently defined subset of T_{h} cells. Their main functions involve maintaining self-tolerance and immune homeostasis. Treg differentiation is induced by expression of FoxP3 transcription factor, and Tregs secrete a variety of immunosuppressive cytokines, such as TGF-β. Tregs are detrimental to anti-tumor immune responses, as the secretion of TGF-β and other suppressive cytokines dampens immunity from CTLs, T_{h} cells and APCs.

== IFN-γ ==
A number of mechanisms have been proposed to explain the role of IFN-γ in antitumor immunity. In conjuncture with TNF (Tumor Necrosis Factors), IFN-γ can have direct cytotoxic effects on tumor cells (Franzen et al., 1986) Increased MHC expression, as a direct result of increased IFN-γ secretion, may result in increased presentation to T cells. (Abbas and Lichtman, 2005) It has also been shown to be involved in the expression of iNOS as well as ROIs.

iNOS (inducible nitric oxide synthase) is an enzyme responsible for the production of NO, an important molecule used by macrophages to kill infected cells. (Abbas and Lichtman, 2005) A decrease in the levels of iNOS, (as seen through immunohistochemical staining) has been observed in IFNγ^{−/−} mice although levels of macrophages at the site of tumor challenge are similar to wild type mice. INOS ^{−/−} mice also show decreased immunity, indicating a direct role of CD4^{+}-stimulated iNOS production in protection against tumours. (Hung et al., 1998) Similar results have been seen in knockout mice deficient in gp91phox, a protein involved in the production ROIs (Reactive Oxygen Intermediates) which are also an important weapon utilized by macrophages to elicit cell death.

In 2000, Qin and Blankenstein, showed that IFNγ production was necessary for CD4^{+} T cell-mediated antitumor immunity. A series of experiments showed that it was essential for nonhematopoietic cells at the site of challenge, to express functional IFNγ receptors. Further experiments showed that IFN-γ was responsible for inhibition of tumor induced angiogenesis and could prevent tumor growth through this method. (Qin and Blankenstein, 2000)

== MHC class II and immunotherapy ==
Many of the aforementioned mechanisms by which CD4^{+} cells play a role in tumor immunity are dependent on phagocytosis of tumors by APCs and subsequent presentation on MHC class II. It is rare that tumor cells will express sufficient MHC class II to directly activate a CD4^{+} T cell. As such, at least two approaches have been investigated to enhance the activation of CD4^{+} T cells. The simplest approach involves upregulation of adhesion molecules, thus extending the presentation of antigens by APC. (Chamuleau et al., 2006) A second approach involves increasing the expression of MHC class II in tumor cells. This technique has not been used in vivo, but rather involves injection of tumor cells which have been transfected to express MHC class II molecules, in addition to suppression of the invariant chain (Ii, see below) through antisense technology. (Qiu, 1999) Mice vaccinated with irradiated strains of these cells show a greater immune response to subsequent challenge by the same tumor, without the upregulation of MHC class II, then do mice vaccinated with irradiated, but otherwise unaltered tumor cells. These findings signify a promising area of future research in the development of cancer vaccines.

== MHC class I and class II pathways ==
The down regulation of the invariant chain (Ii) becomes important when considering the two pathways by which antigens are presented by cells. Most recognized tumor antigens are endogenously produced, altered gene products of mutated cells. These antigens, however, are normally only presented by MHC class I molecules, to CD8^{+} T cells, and not expressed on the cell surface bound to MHC class II molecules, which is required for presentation to CD4^{+} T cells. Research has shown that the two pathways by which antigens are presented cross over in the endoplasmic reticulum of the cell, in which MHC class I, MHC class II and endogenously synthesized antigenic proteins are all present. These antigen proteins are prevented from binding to MHC class II molecules by a protein known as the invariant chain or Ii, which, in a normal cell, remains bound to the MHC class II molecule until leaving the ER. Down regulation of this Ii, using antisense technology, has yielded promising results in allowing MHC class I tumor antigens to be expressed on MHC class II molecules at the cell surface (Qui, 1999).

== Upregulation of MHC class II ==
Due to the extremely polymorphic nature of MHC class II molecules, simple transfection of these proteins does not provide a practical method for use as a cancer vaccine. (Chamuleau et al., 2006) Alternately, two other methods have been examined to upregulate the expression of these proteins on MHC class II^{−} cells. The first is treatment with IFNγ, which can lead to increased MHC class II expression. (Trincheiri and Perussia, 1985, Fransen L, 1986) A second, more effective approach involves targeting the genes responsible for the synthesis of these proteins, the CIITA or class II transcription activator. Selective gene targeting of CIITA has been used ex vivo to allow MHC class II^{−} cells to become MHC class II^{+} (Xu, et al. 2000). upregulation of CIITA also causes an increased expression of Ii, and as such, must be used in conjunction with the antisense techniques referred to earlier (Qui, 1999). In some forms of cancer, such as acute myeloid leukemia (AML) the cells may already be MHC class II^{+}, but because of mutation, express low levels on their surface. It is believed that low levels are seen as a direct result of methylation of the CIITA promoter genes (Morimoto et al., 2004, Chamuleau et al., 2006) and that demethylation of these promoters may restore MHC class II expression (Chamuleau et al., 2006).

== See also ==
List of distinct cell types in the adult human body
