= Otelixizumab =

Monoclonal antibody

Monoclonal antibody
- Type: Whole antibody
- Source: Chimeric/humanized hybrid (rat/human)
- Target: CD3E

Clinical data
- ATC code: none

Identifiers
- CAS Number: 881191-44-2
- ChemSpider: none
- UNII: I5HF2X04PB
- KEGG: D08959

Chemical and physical data
- Formula: C_{6448}H_{9954}N_{1718}O_{2016}S_{42}
- Molar mass: 145145.09 g·mol^{−1}

Otelixizumab, also known as TRX4, is a monoclonal antibody, which is being developed for the treatment of type 1 diabetes and other autoimmune diseases. The antibody is being developed by Tolerx, Inc. in collaboration with GlaxoSmithKline and is being manufactured by Abbott Laboratories.

== Mechanism of action ==
Otelixizumab is one of several investigational monoclonal antibodies that target CD3, a T lymphocyte receptor involved in normal cell signaling. More specifically, otelixizumab targets the epsilon chain of CD3. Data suggest that the drug works by blocking the function of effector T cells, which mistakenly attack and destroy insulin-producing beta cells, while stimulating regulatory T cells, which are understood to protect against effector T cell damage, thus preserving the beta cells' normal ability to make insulin.

Proof of concept was established in a randomized, placebo-controlled Phase 2 study. These data demonstrated otelixizumab's ability to preserve beta cell function, as measured by C-peptide, in patients up to 18 months after dosing, as well as reduce the need for delivered insulin to maintain glucose control.

== Clinical progress ==
The efficacy and safety of otelixizumab for the treatment of autoimmune type 1 diabetes was studied in a pivotal Phase 3 study called DEFEND (Durable-response therapy Evaluation For Early or New-onset type 1 Diabetes). DEFEND was a randomized, placebo-controlled Phase 3 trial designed to enroll approximately 240 adult patients, age 18 to 45, with newly diagnosed autoimmune type 1 diabetes. DEFEND was conducted at multiple centers in North America and Europe. The trial was designed to evaluate whether a single course of otelixizumab, administered not more than 90 days after the initial diagnosis, would reduce the amount of administered insulin required to control blood glucose levels by inhibiting the destruction of beta cells. The trial failed to show efficacy of the treatment.

== Orphan drug status ==
Otelixizumab has been granted "orphan drug" status by the U.S. Food and Drug Administration.

== Chemistry ==
As a monoclonal antibody, otelixizumab consists of two heavy chains and two light chains. The heavy chains are humanized γ1 (gamma-1) chains from rats, making otelixizumab an immunoglobulin G1. The light chains are chimeric human/rat λ (lambda) chains.
