= CD4 =

Marker on immune cells

Identifiers
- Aliases: CD4, CD4mut, CD4 molecule, OKT4D, IMD79
- External IDs: OMIM: 186940; MGI: 88335; GeneCards: CD4
Available structures
PDB	Ortholog search: PDBe RCSB
PDB	List of PDB id codes 1CDH, 1CDI, 1CDJ, 1CDU, 1CDY, 1G9M, 1G9N, 1GC1, 1JL4, 1Q68, 1RZJ, 1RZK, 1WIO, 1WIP, 1WIQ, 2B4C, 2JKR, 2JKT, 2KLU, 2NXY, 2NXZ, 2NY0, 2NY1, 2NY2, 2NY3, 2NY4, 2NY5, 2NY6, 2QAD, 3B71, 3CD4, 3JWD, 3JWO, 3LQA, 3O2D, 3S5L, 3T0E, 4JM2, 1WBR, 3S4S, 4H8W, 4P9H, 4Q6I, 4R2G, 4R4H, 4RQS, 3J70, 5A7X, 5A8H, 5CAY

Gene location (Human)
Chr.	Chromosome 12 (human)
Band	12p13.31	Start	6,786,858 bp
Band	12p13.31	End	6,820,799 bp

Gene location (Mouse)
Chr.	Chromosome 6 (mouse)
Band	6 F2|6 59.17 cM	Start	124,841,655 bp
Band	6 F2|6 59.17 cM	End	124,865,184 bp
RNA expression pattern
Bgee	Human / Mouse (ortholog); Top expressed in: granulocyte; monocyte; lymph node; spleen; appendix; gallbladder; thymus; upper lobe of left lung; right lung; right lobe of liver / Top expressed in: thymus; lymph node; mesenteric lymph nodes; blood; spleen; zygote; external carotid artery; internal carotid artery; superior frontal gyrus; molar; More reference expression data
BioGPS	n/a
Gene ontology
Molecular function	transmembrane signaling receptor activity; virus receptor activity; protein homodimerization activity; zinc ion binding; extracellular matrix structural constituent; enzyme binding; immunoglobulin binding; protein binding; coreceptor activity; interleukin-16 binding; interleukin-16 receptor activity; MHC class II protein binding; identical protein binding; protein tyrosine kinase binding; signaling receptor activity; protein kinase binding; signaling receptor binding
Cellular component	endoplasmic reticulum lumen; integral component of membrane; early endosome; membrane; cell surface; endoplasmic reticulum membrane; membrane raft; T cell receptor complex; external side of plasma membrane; plasma membrane; clathrin-coated vesicle membrane; integral component of plasma membrane
Biological process	transmembrane receptor protein tyrosine kinase signaling pathway; defense response to Gram-negative bacterium; positive regulation of protein kinase activity; mitigation of host defenses by virus; positive regulation of calcium-mediated signaling; signal transduction; helper T cell enhancement of adaptive immune response; T cell selection; response to estradiol; induction by virus of host cell-cell fusion; adaptive immune response; response to vitamin D; T cell differentiation; cell surface receptor signaling pathway; positive regulation of T cell proliferation; positive regulation of peptidyl-tyrosine phosphorylation; enzyme linked receptor protein signaling pathway; T cell activation; positive regulation of T cell activation; maintenance of protein location in cell; cytokine production; T cell receptor signaling pathway; immune system process; positive regulation of calcium ion transport into cytosol; regulation of T cell activation; immune response; cell adhesion; viral process; fusion of virus membrane with host plasma membrane; membrane organization; positive regulation of protein phosphorylation; positive regulation of kinase activity; interleukin-15-mediated signaling pathway; positive regulation of I-kappaB kinase/NF-kappaB signaling; positive regulation of MAPK cascade; positive regulation of monocyte differentiation; positive regulation of transcription, DNA-templated; positive regulation of viral entry into host cell; regulation of calcium ion transport; positive regulation of ERK1 and ERK2 cascade; cellular response to granulocyte macrophage colony-stimulating factor stimulus; cytokine-mediated signaling pathway; macrophage differentiation
Sources:Amigo / QuickGO
Orthologs
Databases	NCBI: entry; OMA: entry
Species	Human	Mouse
Entrez	920	12504
Ensembl	ENSG00000010610	ENSMUSG00000023274
UniProt	P01730	P06332
RefSeq (mRNA)	NM_000616; NM_001195014; NM_001195015; NM_001195016; NM_001195017 NM_001382705; NM_001382706; NM_001382707; NM_001382714	NM_013488
RefSeq (protein)	NP_000607; NP_001181943; NP_001181944; NP_001181945; NP_001181946 NP_001369634; NP_001369635; NP_001369636; NP_001369643	NP_038516
Location (UCSC)	Chr 12: 6.79 – 6.82 Mb	Chr 6: 124.84 – 124.87 Mb
PubMed search
- Wikidata
View/Edit Human	View/Edit Mouse

CD4, Cluster of differentiation 4, extracellular
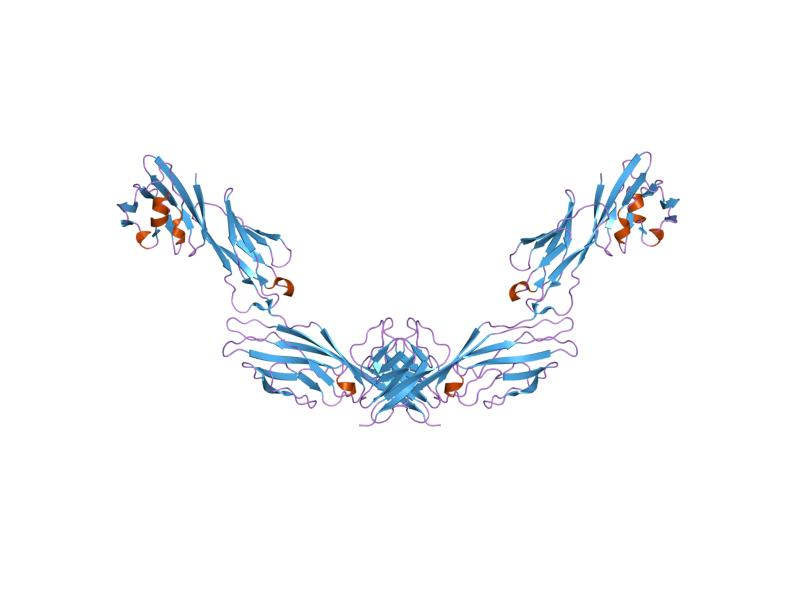
- structure of T cell surface glycoprotein cd4, monoclinic crystal form

Identifiers
- Symbol: CD4-extrcel
- Pfam: PF09191
- InterPro: IPR015274
- SCOP2: 1cid / SCOPe / SUPFAM
- OPM superfamily: 193
- OPM protein: 2klu
- CDD: cd07695
- Membranome: 27
Available protein structures:
- PDB: IPR015274 PF09191 (ECOD; PDBsum)
- AlphaFold: IPR015274; PF09191

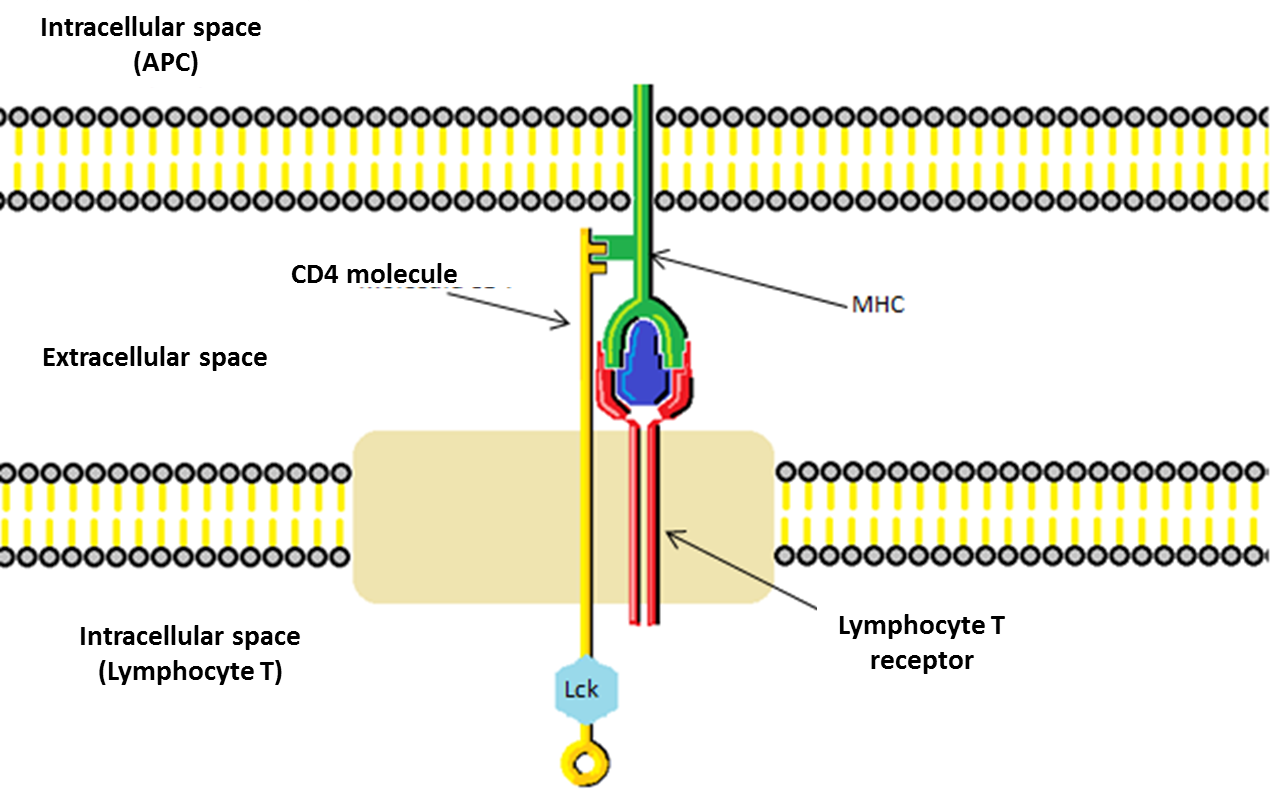
Image of CD4 co-receptor binding to MHC (Major Histocompatibility Complex) non-polymorphic region.

In molecular biology, CD4 (cluster of differentiation 4) is a glycoprotein that serves as a co-receptor for the T-cell receptor (TCR). CD4 is found on the surface of immune cells such as helper T cells, monocytes, macrophages, and dendritic cells. It was discovered in the late 1970s and was originally known as leu-3 and T4 (after the OKT4 monoclonal antibody that reacted with it) before being named CD4 in 1984. In humans, the CD4 protein is encoded by the CD4 gene.

CD4^{+} T helper cells are white blood cells that are an essential part of the human immune system. They are often referred to as CD4 cells, T helper cells or T4 cells. They are called helper cells because one of their main roles is to send signals to other types of immune cells, including CD8 killer cells, which then destroy the infectious particle. If CD4 cells become depleted, for example in untreated HIV infection, or following immune suppression prior to a transplant, the body is left vulnerable to a wide range of infections that it would otherwise have been able to fight.

== Structure ==
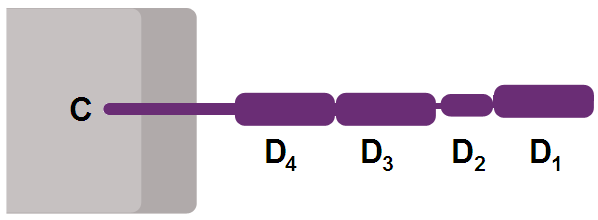
Schematic representation of CD4 receptor.

Like many cell surface receptors/markers, CD4 is a member of the immunoglobulin superfamily.

It has four immunoglobulin domains (D_{1} to D_{4}) that are exposed on the extracellular surface of the cell:

- D_{1} and D_{3} resemble immunoglobulin variable (IgV) domains.
- D_{2} and D_{4} resemble immunoglobulin constant (IgC) domains.

The immunoglobulin variable (IgV) domain of D_{1} adopts an immunoglobulin-like β-sandwich fold with seven β-strands in two β-sheets, in a Greek key topology.

CD4 interacts with the β_{2}-domain of MHC class II molecules through its D_{1} domain. T cells displaying CD4 molecules (and not CD8) on their surface, therefore, are specific for antigens presented by MHC II and not by MHC class I (they are MHC class II-restricted). MHC class I contains Beta-2 microglobulin.

The short cytoplasmic/intracellular tail (C) of CD4 contains a special sequence of amino acids that allow it to recruit and interact with the tyrosine kinase Lck.

== Function ==
CD4 is a co-receptor of the T cell receptor (TCR) and assists the latter in communicating with antigen-presenting cells. The TCR complex and CD4 bind to distinct regions of the antigen-presenting MHC class II molecule. The extracellular D_{1} domain of CD4 binds to the β2 region of MHC class II. The resulting close proximity between the TCR complex and CD4 allows the tyrosine kinase Lck bound to the cytoplasmic tail of CD4 to phosphorylate tyrosine residues of immunoreceptor tyrosine activation motifs (ITAMs) on the cytoplasmic domains of CD3 to amplify the signal generated by the TCR. Phosphorylated ITAMs on CD3 recruit and activate SH2 domain-containing protein tyrosine kinases (PTK), such as ZAP70, to further mediate downstream signalling through tyrosine phosphorylation. These signals lead to the activation of transcription factors, including NF-κB, NFAT, AP-1, to promote T cell activation.

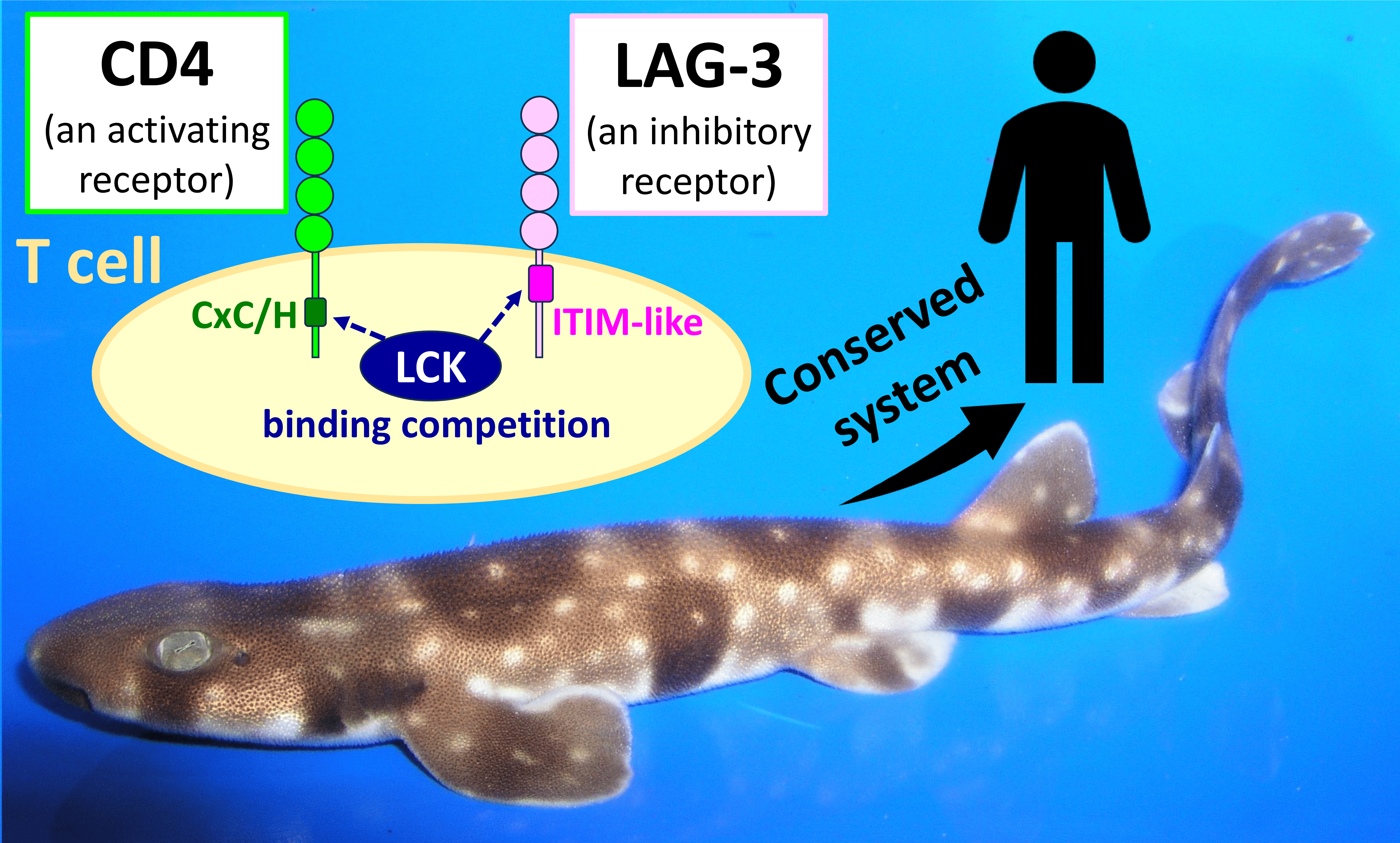
Conservation of their respective cytoplasmic tail motifs, CxC/H in the case of CD4 and an ITIM-like motif in the case of LAG-3, supports that competition between CD4 and LAG-3 for binding of kinase LCK is a conserved core part of the jawed vertebrate immune system.

CD4 is closely related to LAG-3, and together they form an evolutionary conserved system from the level of sharks competing for binding Lck by conserved motifs in their cytoplasmic tails: CD4 through a Cys-X-Cys/His motif and LAG-3 through an immunoreceptor tyrosine-based inhibition motif like (ITIM-like) motif. LAG-3, which is an inhibitory receptor, is upregulated in activated T cells as a kind of negative feedback loop.

=== Other interactions ===
CD4 has also been shown to interact with SPG21, and Uncoordinated-119 (Unc-119).

== Disease ==
=== HIV infection ===
HIV-1 uses CD4 to gain entry into host T-cells and achieves this through its viral envelope protein known as gp120. The binding to CD4 creates a shift in the conformation of gp120 allowing HIV-1 to bind to a co-receptor expressed on the host cell. These co-receptors are chemokine receptors CCR5 or CXCR4. Following a structural change in another viral protein (gp41), HIV inserts a fusion peptide into the host cell that allows the outer membrane of the virus to fuse with the cell membrane.

=== HIV pathology ===
HIV infection leads to a progressive reduction in the number of T cells expressing CD4. Medical professionals refer to the CD4 count to decide when to begin treatment during HIV infection, although recent medical guidelines have changed to recommend treatment as soon as HIV is diagnosed regardless of CD4 counts. A CD4 count measures the number of T cells expressing CD4. While CD4 counts are not a direct HIV test—e.g. they do not check the presence of viral DNA, or specific antibodies against HIV—they are used to assess the immune system of a patient.

National Institutes of Health guidelines recommend treatment of any HIV-positive individuals, regardless of CD4 count Normal blood values are usually expressed as the number of cells per microliter (μL, or equivalently, cubic millimeter, mm^{3}) of blood, with normal values for CD4 cells being 500–1200 cells/mm^{3}. Patients often undergo treatments when the CD4 counts reach a level of 350 cells per microliter in Europe but usually around 500/μL in the US; people with less than 200 cells per microliter are at high risk of contracting AIDS defined illnesses. Medical professionals also refer to CD4 tests to determine efficacy of treatment.

Viral load testing provides more information about the efficacy for therapy than CD4 counts. For the first 2 years of HIV therapy, CD4 counts may be done every 3–6 months. If a patient's viral load becomes undetectable after 2 years then CD4 counts might not be needed if they are consistently above 500/mm^{3}. If the count remains at 300–500/mm^{3}, then the tests can be done annually. It is not necessary to schedule CD4 counts with viral load tests and the two should be done independently when each is indicated.

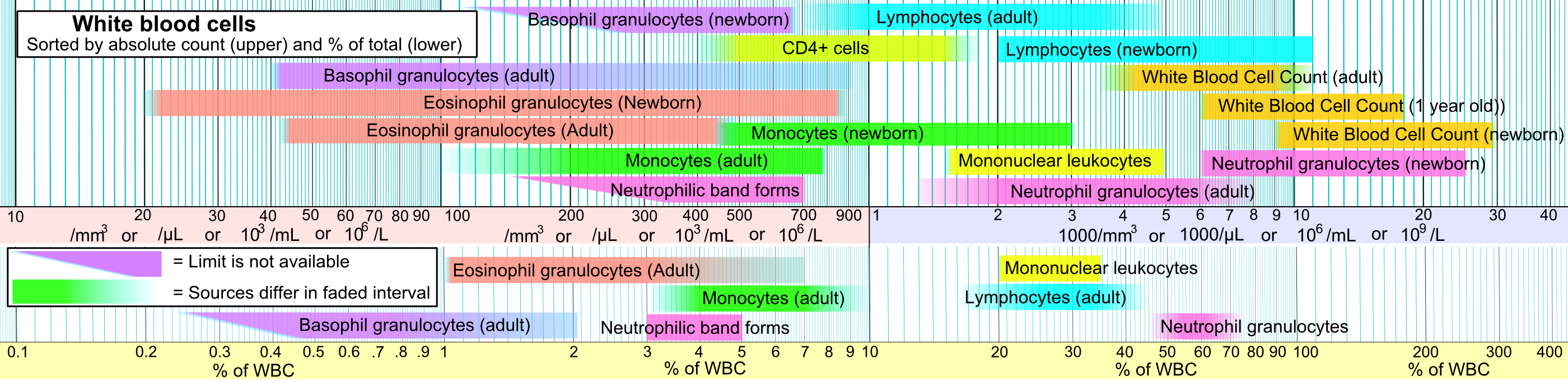
Reference ranges for blood tests of white blood cells, comparing CD4^{+} cell amount (shown in green-yellow) with other cells.

=== Other diseases ===
CD4 continues to be expressed in most neoplasms derived from T helper cells. It is therefore possible to use CD4 immunohistochemistry on tissue biopsy samples to identify most forms of peripheral T cell lymphoma and related malignant conditions. The antigen has also been associated with a number of autoimmune diseases such as vitiligo and type I diabetes mellitus.

T-cells play a large part in autoinflammatory diseases. When testing a drug's efficacy or studying diseases, it is helpful to quantify the amount of T-cells on fresh-frozen tissue with CD4^{+}, CD8^{+}, and CD3^{+} T-cell markers (which stain different markers on a T-cell – giving different results).

== See also ==
- CD4^{+} T cells and antitumor immunity
