= POLR1G =

Protein-coding gene in humans

Identifiers
- Aliases: POLR1G, ASE-1, ASE1, CAST, PAF49, CD3e molecule associated protein, RPA34, RNA polymerase I subunit G, CD3EAP
- External IDs: OMIM: 107325; MGI: 1917583; GeneCards: POLR1G

Gene location (Human)
Chr.	Chromosome 19 (human)
Band	19q13.32	Start	45,406,644 bp
Band	19q13.32	End	45,410,737 bp

Gene location (Mouse)
Chr.	Chromosome 7 (mouse)
Band	7|7 A3	Start	19,089,939 bp
Band	7|7 A3	End	19,093,408 bp
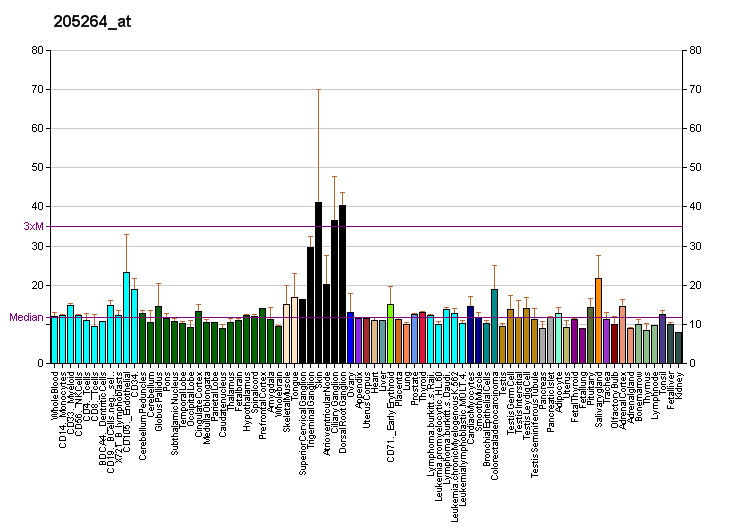
RNA expression pattern
Bgee	Human / Mouse (ortholog); Top expressed in: gonad; oocyte; secondary oocyte; testicle; mucosa of urinary bladder; tibialis anterior muscle; buccal mucosa cell; gingival epithelium; gastrocnemius muscle; endothelial cell / Top expressed in: otic vesicle; hand; internal carotid artery; fossa; external carotid artery; epiblast; Paneth cell; condyle; muscle of thigh; embryo; More reference expression data
BioGPS	More reference expression data
Gene ontology
Molecular function	DNA-directed 5'-3' RNA polymerase activity; RNA binding
Cellular component	RNA polymerase I complex; RNA polymerase I transcription regulator complex; mitochondrion; nucleus; nucleoplasm; chromosome; fibrillar center; nucleolus; cytosol
Biological process	transcription initiation from RNA polymerase I promoter; termination of RNA polymerase I transcription; epigenetic maintenance of chromatin in transcription-competent conformation; rRNA transcription; transcription elongation from RNA polymerase I promoter; transmembrane receptor protein tyrosine kinase signaling pathway; transcription by RNA polymerase I
Sources:Amigo / QuickGO
Orthologs
Databases	NCBI: entry; OMA: entry
Species	Human	Mouse
Entrez	10849	70333
Ensembl	ENSG00000117877	ENSMUSG00000047649
UniProt	O15446	Q76KJ5
RefSeq (mRNA)	NM_012099; NM_001297590	NM_145822
RefSeq (protein)	NP_001284519; NP_036231	NP_665821
Location (UCSC)	Chr 19: 45.41 – 45.41 Mb	Chr 7: 19.09 – 19.09 Mb
PubMed search
- Wikidata
View/Edit Human	View/Edit Mouse

DNA-directed RNA polymerase I subunit RPA34 is an enzyme that in humans is encoded by the POLR1G gene (previously CD3EAP). This protein is part of the RNA polymerase I complex.

== Interactions ==
POLR1G has been shown to interact with T-cell surface glycoprotein CD3 epsilon chain, POLR1E and POLR1C.
