= CD8A =

Protein-coding gene in humans

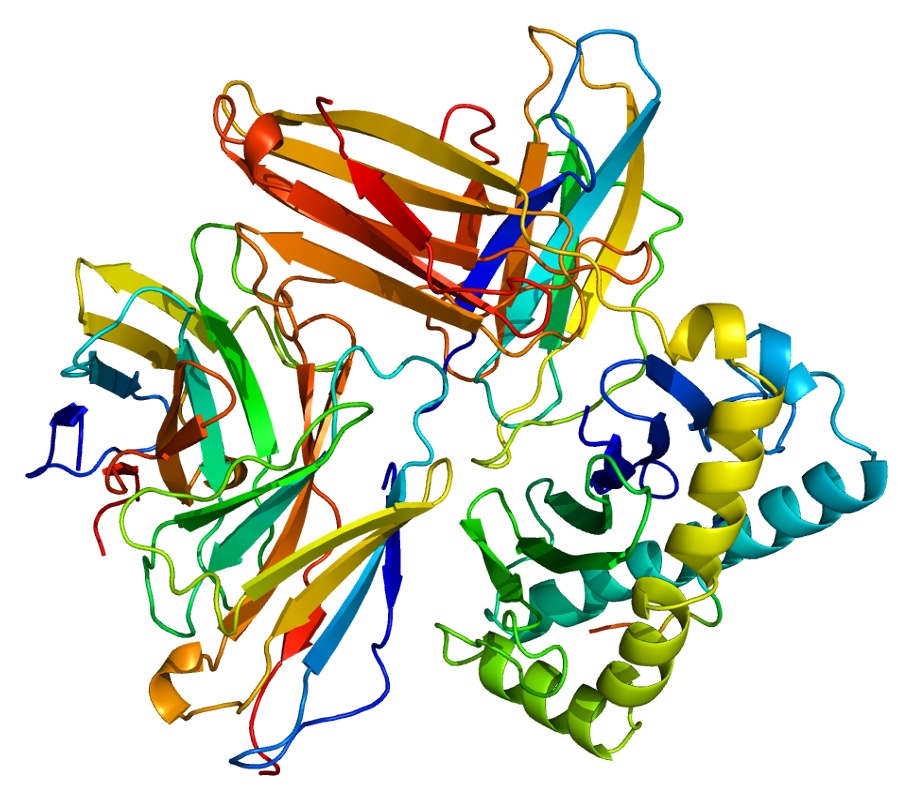

Identifiers
- Aliases: CD8A, CD8, Leu2, MAL, p32, CD8a molecule
- External IDs: OMIM: 186910; MGI: 88346; GeneCards: CD8A
Available structures
PDB	Ortholog search: PDBe RCSB
PDB	List of PDB id codes 1AKJ, 1CD8, 1Q69, 2HP4, 3QZW

Gene location (Human)
Chr.	Chromosome 2 (human)
Band	2p11.2	Start	86,784,610 bp
Band	2p11.2	End	86,808,396 bp

Gene location (Mouse)
Chr.	Chromosome 6 (mouse)
Band	6 C1|6 32.14 cM	Start	71,350,411 bp
Band	6 C1|6 32.14 cM	End	71,356,157 bp
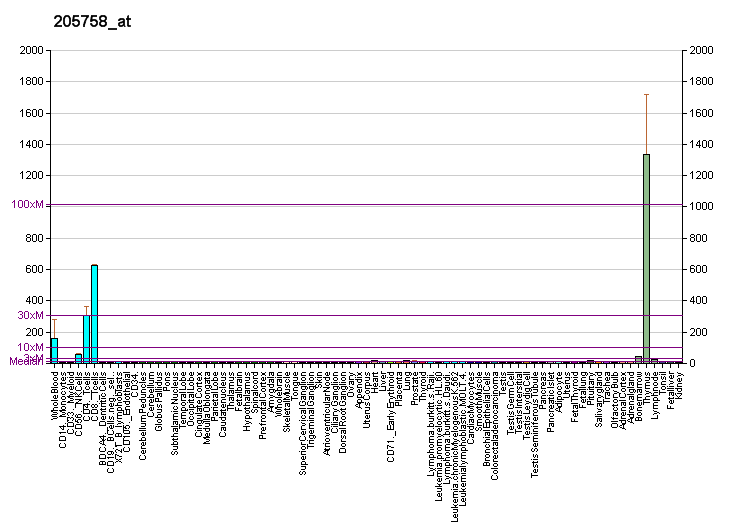
RNA expression pattern
Bgee	Human / Mouse (ortholog); Top expressed in: thymus; spleen; granulocyte; blood; superficial temporal artery; lymph node; jejunal mucosa; appendix; bone marrow; bone marrow cell / Top expressed in: thymus; mesenteric lymph nodes; blood; spleen; subcutaneous adipose tissue; duodenum; embryo; jejunum; sternocleidomastoid muscle; lumbar subsegment of spinal cord; More reference expression data
BioGPS	More reference expression data
Gene ontology
Molecular function	coreceptor activity; protein binding; MHC class I protein binding; protein kinase binding; MHC class I protein complex binding
Cellular component	integral component of membrane; membrane; plasma membrane; integral component of plasma membrane; T cell receptor complex; extracellular region; plasma membrane raft; external side of plasma membrane
Biological process	antigen processing and presentation; adaptive immune response; transmembrane receptor protein tyrosine kinase signaling pathway; immune system process; immune response; regulation of immune response; T cell activation; T cell mediated immunity; cell surface receptor signaling pathway; cytotoxic T cell differentiation
Sources:Amigo / QuickGO
Orthologs
Databases	NCBI: entry; OMA: entry
Species	Human	Mouse
Entrez	925	12525
Ensembl	ENSG00000153563	ENSMUSG00000053977
UniProt	P01732	P01731
RefSeq (mRNA)	NM_001145873; NM_001768; NM_171827	NM_001081110; NM_009857
RefSeq (protein)	NP_001139345; NP_001759; NP_741969; NP_001369627	NP_001074579; NP_033987
Location (UCSC)	Chr 2: 86.78 – 86.81 Mb	Chr 6: 71.35 – 71.36 Mb
PubMed search
- Wikidata
View/Edit Human	View/Edit Mouse

T-cell surface glycoprotein CD8 alpha chain (Cluster of Differentiation 8a), is a protein encoded by CD8A gene.

== Function ==
The CD8 protein is a cell surface glycoprotein found on most cytotoxic T lymphocytes that mediates efficient cell-cell interactions within the immune system. The CD8, acting as a coreceptor, and the T-cell receptor on the T lymphocyte recognize antigen displayed by an antigen-presenting cell (APC) in the context of class I MHC molecules. The functional coreceptor is either a homodimer composed of two alpha chains, or a heterodimer composed of one alpha and one beta chain. Both alpha and beta chains share significant homology to variable domain of immunoglobulin light chains. This gene encodes the CD8 alpha chain isoforms. Two alternative transcripts encoding distinct isoforms, one membrane associated and one secreted, have been identified.

== Interactions ==
CD8A has been shown to interact with:

- CD3D,
- HLA-A, and
- HLA-G.

== See also ==
- Cluster of differentiation
