= Executive Order 13139 =

1999 United States executive order

Executive Order 13139— entitled Improving Health Protection of Military Personnel Participating in Particular Military Operations — as an executive order (EO) issued by U.S. President Bill Clinton on 30 September 1999. It outlines the conditions under which Investigational New Drug (IND) and off-label pharmaceuticals can be administered to U.S. service members. An “off-label" indication is a use of a drug in a manner (or for a condition) other than that for which they were originally licensed.

EO13139 provides the US Secretary of Defense guidance regarding the provision of IND products or products unapproved for their intended use as antidotes to chemical, biological, or radiological weapons; stipulates that the U.S. government will administer products approved by the U.S. Food and Drug Administration only for their intended use; provides the circumstances and controls under which IND products may be used.

It also stipulates that to administer an IND product, informed consent must be obtained from individual service members. However, the President of the United States may waive informed consent (at the request of the Secretary of Defense and only the Secretary of Defense) if:

- Informed consent is not feasible
- Informed consent is contrary to the best interests of the service member
- Obtaining informed consent is not in the best interests of national security.

In the 2003 case of Doe v. Rumsfeld, the United States District Court for the District of Columbia enjoined the United States Air Force from requiring administration of an unlicensed anthrax vaccine to personnel pursuant to EO13139, noting that a waiver from the President had not been requested. This injunction dissolved in 2005, when the vaccine was licensed, and no longer considered experimental.
