= Immunoreceptor tyrosine-based activation motif =

An immunoreceptor tyrosine-based activation motif (ITAM) is a conserved sequence of four amino acids that is repeated twice in the cytoplasmic tails of non-catalytic tyrosine-phosphorylated receptors, cell-surface proteins found mainly on immune cells. Its major role is being an integral component for the initiation of a variety of signaling pathway and subsequently the activation of immune cells, although different functions have been described, for example an osteoclast maturation.

== Structure ==
The motif contains a tyrosine separated from a leucine or isoleucine by any two other amino acids, giving the signature YxxL/I. Two of these signatures are typically separated by between 6 and 8 amino acids in the cytoplasmic tail of the molecule (YxxL/Ix_{(6–8)}YxxL/I). However, in various sources, this consensus sequence differs, mainly in the number of amino acids between individual signatures. Apart from ITAMs which have the structure described above, there is also a variety of proteins containing ITAM-like motifs, which have a very similar structure and function (for example in Dectin-1 protein).

== Function ==
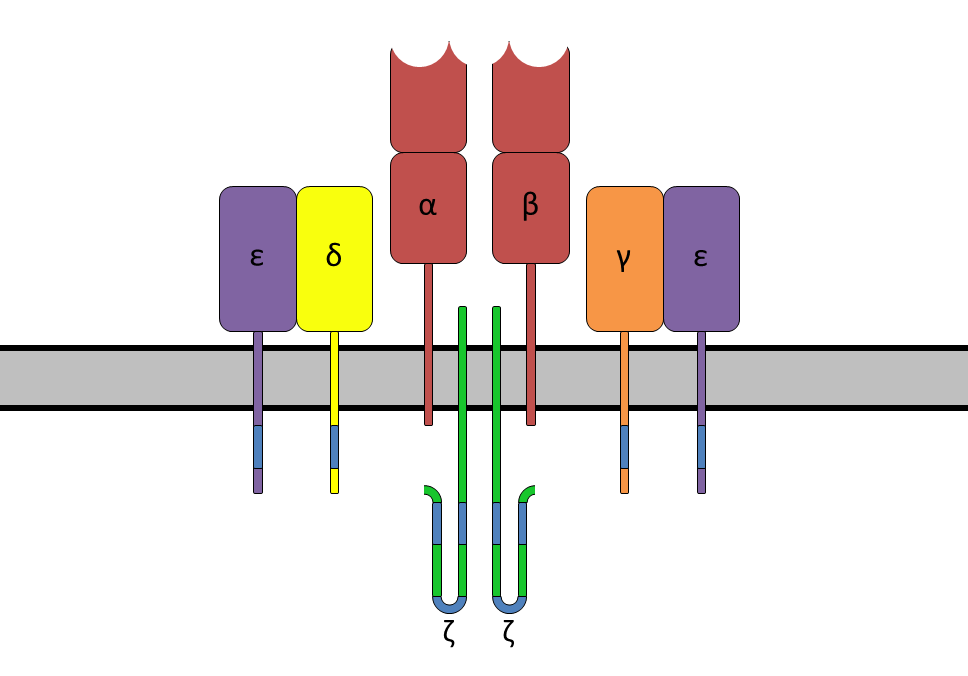
The T-cell receptor complex with TCR-α and TCR-β chains, CD3 and ζ-chain accessory molecules. ITAMs are represented in blue on the tails of the CD3 subunits.

ITAMs are important for signal transduction, mainly in immune cells. They are found in the cytoplasmic tails of non-catalytic tyrosine-phosphorylated receptors such as the CD3 and ζ-chains of the T cell receptor complex, the CD79-alpha and -beta chains of the B cell receptor complex, and certain Fc receptors. The tyrosine residues within these motifs become phosphorylated by Src family kinases following interaction of the receptor molecules with their ligands. Phosphorylated ITAMs serve as docking sites for other proteins containing a SH2 domain, usually two domains in tandem, inducing a signaling cascade mediated by Syk family kinases (which are the primary proteins that bind to phosphorylated ITAMs), namely either Syk or ZAP-70, resulting mostly in the activation of given cell. Paradoxically, in some cases, ITAMs and ITAM-like motifs do not have an activating effect, but rather an inhibitory one. Exact mechanisms of this phenomenon are as of yet not elucidated.

Other non-catalytic tyrosine-phosphorylated receptors carry a conserved inhibitory motif (ITIM) that, when phosphorylated, results in the inhibition of the signaling pathway via recruitment of phosphatases, namely SHP-1, SHP-2 and SHIP1. This serves not only for inhibition and regulation of signalling pathways related to ITAM-based signalling, but also for termination of signalling.

== Genetic variations ==
Rare human genetic mutations are catalogued in the human genetic variation databases which can reportedly result in creation or deletion of ITIM and ITAMs.

== Examples ==
Examples shown below list both proteins that contain the ITAM themselves and proteins that use ITAM-based signalling with the help of associated proteins which contain the motif.

CD3γ, CD3δ, CD3ε, TYROBP (DAP12), FcαRI, FcγRI, FcγRII, FcγRIII, Dectin-1, CLEC-1, CD28, CD72
