= POLR1D =

Protein-coding gene in the species Homo sapiens

Identifiers
- Aliases: POLR1D, AC19, POLR1C, RPA16, RPA9, RPAC2, RPC16, RPO1-3, TCS2, polymerase (RNA) I subunit D, RNA polymerase I subunit D, RNA polymerase I and III subunit D
- External IDs: OMIM: 613715; MGI: 108403; GeneCards: POLR1D

Gene location (Human)
Chr.	Chromosome 13 (human)
Band	13q12.2	Start	27,620,742 bp
Band	13q12.2	End	27,744,237 bp

Gene location (Mouse)
Chr.	Chromosome 5 (mouse)
Band	5|5 G3	Start	147,077,050 bp
Band	5|5 G3	End	147,111,597 bp
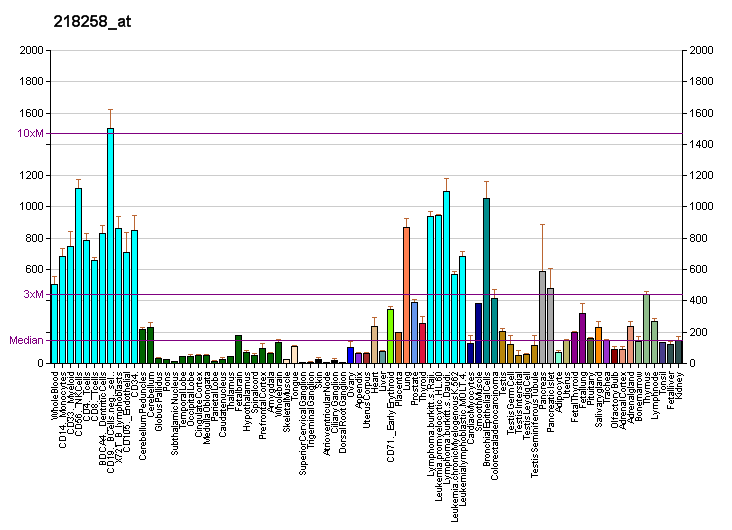
RNA expression pattern
Bgee	Human / Mouse (ortholog); Top expressed in: body of pancreas; secondary oocyte; skin of abdomen; body of stomach; cerebellar hemisphere; right adrenal cortex; right hemisphere of cerebellum; left ovary; left adrenal cortex; right testis / Top expressed in: facial motor nucleus; temporal muscle; sternocleidomastoid muscle; yolk sac; triceps brachii muscle; digastric muscle; salivary gland; embryo; submandibular gland; lacrimal gland; More reference expression data
BioGPS	More reference expression data
Gene ontology
Molecular function	DNA binding; protein dimerization activity; RNA polymerase III activity; DNA-directed 5'-3' RNA polymerase activity; protein binding; RNA polymerase I activity
Cellular component	cytosol; nucleoplasm; RNA polymerase I complex; RNA polymerase III complex; nucleus
Biological process	termination of RNA polymerase I transcription; epigenetic maintenance of chromatin in transcription-competent conformation; transcription initiation from RNA polymerase I promoter; transcription, DNA-templated; transcription elongation from RNA polymerase I promoter; positive regulation of type I interferon production; transcription by RNA polymerase III
Sources:Amigo / QuickGO
Orthologs
Databases	NCBI: entry; OMA: entry
Species	Human	Mouse
Entrez	51082	20018
Ensembl	ENSG00000186184	ENSMUSG00000029642
UniProt	P0DPB5	P97304
RefSeq (mRNA)	NM_001206559; NM_015972; NM_152705; NM_001374407	NM_009087; NM_181730
RefSeq (protein)	NP_001193488; NP_057056; NP_689918; NP_001361336	NP_033113; NP_859419
Location (UCSC)	Chr 13: 27.62 – 27.74 Mb	Chr 5: 147.08 – 147.11 Mb
PubMed search
- Wikidata
View/Edit Human	View/Edit Mouse

DNA-directed RNA polymerases I and III subunit RPAC2 is a protein that in humans is encoded by the POLR1D gene.

== Interactions ==
POLR1D has been shown to interact with POLR1C.
