= Proliferating angioendotheliomatosis =

- Specialty: Oncology

Proliferating Angioendotheliomatosis has historically been divided into two groups, (1) a reactive, involuting type and (2) a malignant, rapidly fatal type.

The reactive involuting type, reactive Angioendotheliomatosis is an rare cutaneous condition characterized histologically by a dense proliferation of small capillaries, and occurs in people with various diseases including subacute bacterial endocarditis and end-stage atherosclerotic disease. These people present with various skin lesions and rashes - most commonly on the thighs. Treatment aimed at the underlying condition hastens the resolution of the lesions.

The malignant type is an intravascular lymphoma, usually of the diffuse B-cell type, known as intravascular large B-cell lymphoma. It progresses rapidly through involvement of multiple body systems and mortality occurs in less than a year from the initial diagnosis. The average age of diagnosis being 55 years. The causative mechanism is unknown. In a few cases treatment with palliative chemotherapy has been effective.

== Classification of Proliferating Angioendotheliomatosis ==
Proliferating angioendotheliomatosis may be divided into two types:

- a reactive type – Reactive angioendotheliomatosis
- a malignant type – Intravascular large B-cell lymphoma

== See also ==
- List of cutaneous conditions
