= POLR1E =

Protein-coding gene in the species Homo sapiens

Identifiers
- Aliases: POLR1E, PAF53, PRAF1, polymerase (RNA) I subunit E, RNA polymerase I subunit E, A49, RPA49
- External IDs: MGI: 1929022; GeneCards: POLR1E

Gene location (Human)
| Chr. | Chromosome 9 (human) |
| Band | 9p13.2 | Start | 37,485,948 bp |
| Band | 9p13.2 | End | 37,503,697 bp |

Gene location (Mouse)
| Chr. | Chromosome 4 (mouse) |
| Band | 4|4 B1 | Start | 45,018,583 bp |
| Band | 4|4 B1 | End | 45,036,565 bp |
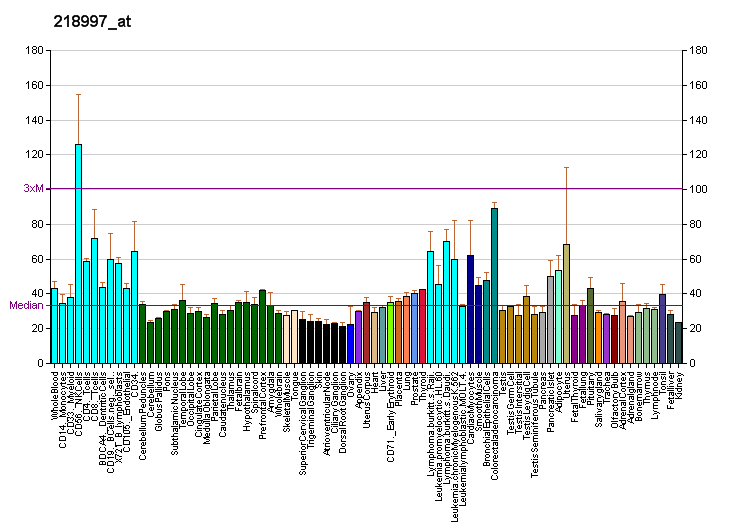
RNA expression pattern
| Bgee | Human / Mouse (ortholog); Top expressed in: body of pancreas; left ovary; Achilles tendon; gonad; body of uterus; right ovary; secondary oocyte; ganglionic eminence; ectocervix; left uterine tube / Top expressed in: otic placode; saccule; embryo; otic vesicle; spermatocyte; morula; epiblast; embryo; tail of embryo; primitive streak; More reference expression data |
| BioGPS | More reference expression data |
Gene ontology
| Molecular function | DNA-directed 5'-3' RNA polymerase activity; DNA binding; RNA polymerase I general transcription initiation factor binding; RNA polymerase I activity |
| Cellular component | nucleus; nucleoplasm; fibrillar center; nucleolus; RNA polymerase I complex |
| Biological process | transcription initiation from RNA polymerase I promoter; termination of RNA polymerase I transcription; epigenetic maintenance of chromatin in transcription-competent conformation; transcription, DNA-templated; RNA polymerase I preinitiation complex assembly; transcription elongation from RNA polymerase I promoter |
Sources:Amigo / QuickGO
Orthologs
| Databases | NCBI: entry; OMA: entry |
| Species | Human | Mouse |
| Entrez | 64425 | 64424 |
| Ensembl | ENSG00000137054 | ENSMUSG00000028318 |
| UniProt | Q9GZS1 | Q8K202 |
| RefSeq (mRNA) | NM_001282766; NM_022490 | NM_001285800; NM_022811 |
| RefSeq (protein) | NP_001269695; NP_071935 | NP_001272729; NP_073722 |
| Location (UCSC) | Chr 9: 37.49 – 37.5 Mb | Chr 4: 45.02 – 45.04 Mb |
| PubMed search |
- Wikidata
| View/Edit Human | View/Edit Mouse |

DNA-directed RNA polymerase I subunit RPA49 is an enzyme that in humans is encoded by the POLR1E gene.

== Interactions ==
POLR1E has been shown to interact with CD3EAP and POLR1C.
