= SPG21 =

Protein-coding gene in the species Homo sapiens

Identifiers
- Aliases: SPG21, ACP33, GL010, MAST, BM-019, spastic paraplegia 21 (autosomal recessive, Mast syndrome), maspardin, ABHD21, SPG21 abhydrolase domain containing, maspardin
- External IDs: OMIM: 608181; MGI: 106403; GeneCards: SPG21

Gene location (Human)
Chr.	Chromosome 15 (human)
Band	15q22.31	Start	64,963,022 bp
Band	15q22.31	End	64,990,310 bp

Gene location (Mouse)
Chr.	Chromosome 9 (mouse)
Band	9 C|9 35.32 cM	Start	65,368,229 bp
Band	9 C|9 35.32 cM	End	65,395,752 bp
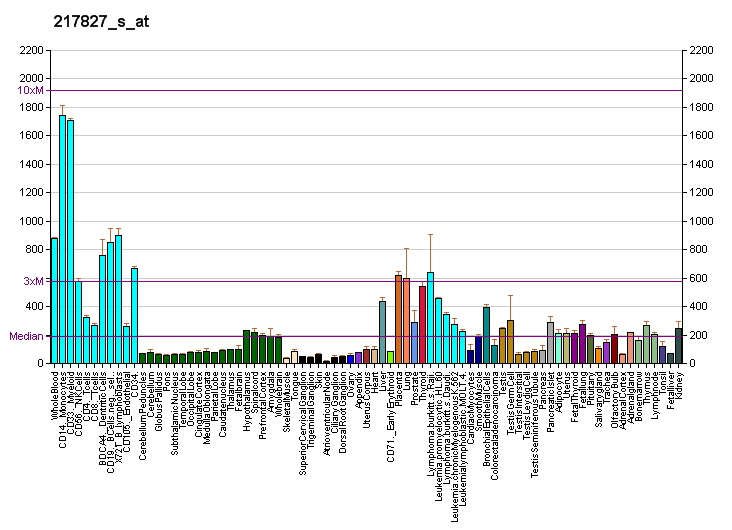
RNA expression pattern
Bgee	Human / Mouse (ortholog); Top expressed in: corpus epididymis; monocyte; right uterine tube; stromal cell of endometrium; secondary oocyte; canal of the cervix; islet of Langerhans; pericardium; gastric mucosa; palpebral conjunctiva / Top expressed in: Ileal epithelium; retinal pigment epithelium; granulocyte; mandibular prominence; stroma of bone marrow; medial ganglionic eminence; white adipose tissue; hand; neural tube; maxillary prominence; More reference expression data
BioGPS	More reference expression data
Gene ontology
Molecular function	CD4 receptor binding; protein binding
Cellular component	Golgi apparatus; endosome membrane; trans-Golgi network transport vesicle; membrane; endosome; intracellular membrane-bounded organelle; cytosol; cytoplasm
Biological process	antigen receptor-mediated signaling pathway
Sources:Amigo / QuickGO
Orthologs
Databases	NCBI: entry; OMA: entry
Species	Human	Mouse
Entrez	51324	27965
Ensembl	ENSG00000090487	ENSMUSG00000032388
UniProt	Q9NZD8	Q9CQC8
RefSeq (mRNA)	NM_001127889; NM_001127890; NM_016630	NM_138584; NM_001357813
RefSeq (protein)	NP_001121361; NP_001121362; NP_057714	NP_613050; NP_001344742
Location (UCSC)	Chr 15: 64.96 – 64.99 Mb	Chr 9: 65.37 – 65.4 Mb
PubMed search
- Wikidata
View/Edit Human	View/Edit Mouse

Maspardin is a protein that in humans is encoded by the SPG21 gene.

The protein encoded by this gene was identified by a two-hybrid screen using CD4 as the bait. It binds to the hydrophobic C-terminal amino acids of CD4 which are involved in repression of T cell activation. The interaction with CD4 is mediated by the noncatalytic alpha/beta hydrolase fold domain of this protein. It is thus proposed that this gene product modulates the stimulatory activity of CD4.

== Interactions ==
SPG21 has been shown to interact with CD4.
