= POLR1C =

Protein-coding gene in the species Homo sapiens

Identifiers
- Aliases: POLR1C, RPA39, RPA40, RPA5, RPAC1, TCS3, AC40, RPC40, HLD11, polymerase (RNA) I subunit C, RNA polymerase I subunit C, RNA polymerase I and III subunit C
- External IDs: OMIM: 610060; MGI: 103288; GeneCards: POLR1C

Gene location (Human)
Chr.	Chromosome 6 (human)
Band	6p21.1	Start	43,509,702 bp
Band	6p21.1	End	43,562,419 bp

Gene location (Mouse)
Chr.	Chromosome 17 (mouse)
Band	17|17 C	Start	46,554,846 bp
Band	17|17 C	End	46,558,980 bp
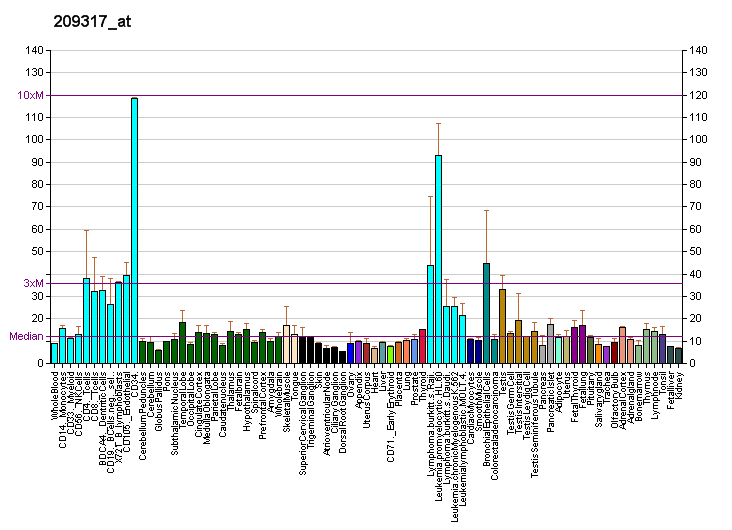

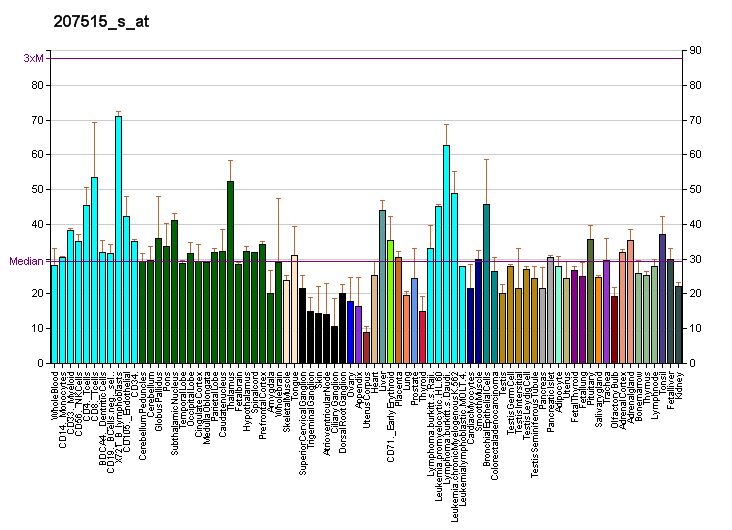
RNA expression pattern
Bgee	Human / Mouse (ortholog); Top expressed in: secondary oocyte; sperm; pancreatic ductal cell; Achilles tendon; gonad; islet of Langerhans; right uterine tube; stromal cell of endometrium; right lobe of thyroid gland; epithelium of nasopharynx / Top expressed in: primitive streak; medullary collecting duct; renal corpuscle; ureter; fossa; condyle; medial ganglionic eminence; maxillary prominence; mandibular prominence; hair follicle; More reference expression data
BioGPS	More reference expression data
Gene ontology
Molecular function	DNA binding; protein dimerization activity; RNA polymerase III activity; DNA-directed 5'-3' RNA polymerase activity; protein binding; RNA polymerase I activity
Cellular component	cytosol; nucleoplasm; RNA polymerase III complex; nucleus; RNA polymerase I complex
Biological process	transcription by RNA polymerase I; termination of RNA polymerase I transcription; epigenetic maintenance of chromatin in transcription-competent conformation; transcription initiation from RNA polymerase I promoter; transcription, DNA-templated; transcription by RNA polymerase III; transcription elongation from RNA polymerase I promoter; positive regulation of type I interferon production
Sources:Amigo / QuickGO
Orthologs
Databases	NCBI: entry; OMA: entry
Species	Human	Mouse
Entrez	9533	20016
Ensembl	ENSG00000171453	ENSMUSG00000067148
UniProt	O15160	P52432
RefSeq (mRNA)	NM_004875; NM_203290; NM_001318876; NM_001363658	NM_009085
RefSeq (protein)	NP_001305805; NP_976035; NP_001350587	NP_033111
Location (UCSC)	Chr 6: 43.51 – 43.56 Mb	Chr 17: 46.55 – 46.56 Mb
PubMed search
- Wikidata
View/Edit Human	View/Edit Mouse

DNA-directed RNA polymerases I and III subunit RPAC1 is a protein that in humans is encoded by the POLR1C gene.

== Interactions ==
POLR1C has been shown to interact with CD3EAP, POLR1E and POLR1D.
