= Investigational New Drug =

USFDA program and procedures

The United States Food and Drug Administration's Investigational New Drug (IND) program is the means by which a pharmaceutical company obtains permission to start human clinical trials and to ship an experimental drug across state lines (usually to clinical investigators) before a marketing application for the drug has been approved. Regulations are primarily at 21 CFR 312. Similar procedures are followed in the European Union, Japan, and Canada due to regulatory harmonization efforts by the International Council for Harmonisation.

== Types ==
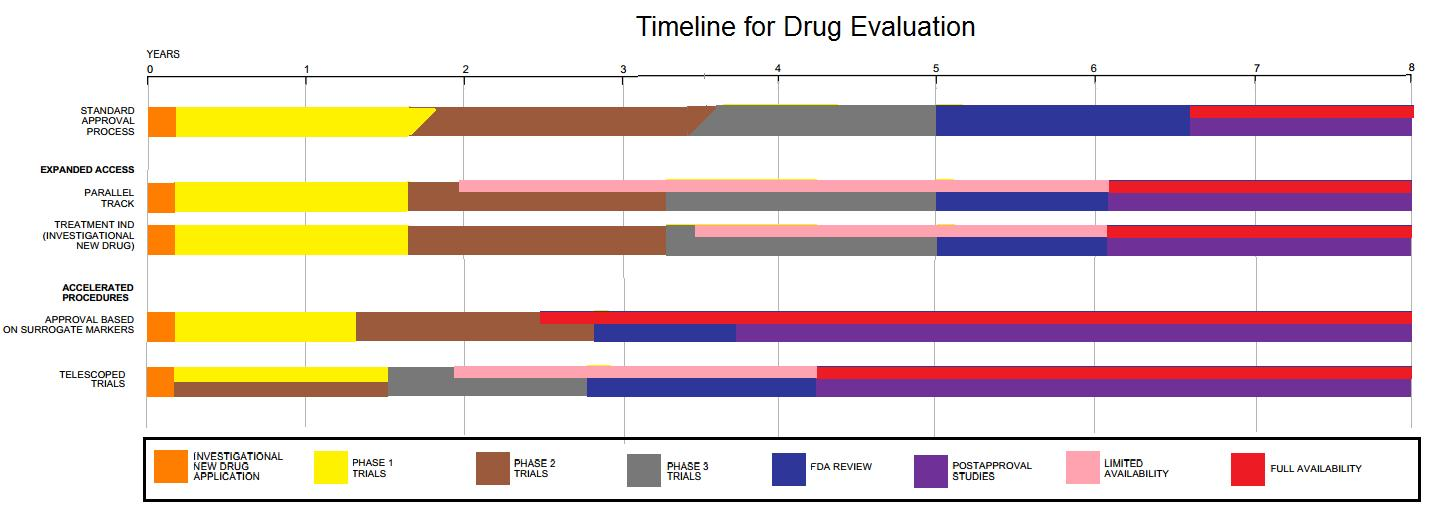
Timeline for drug evaluation

- Research or investigator INDs are non-commercial INDs filed by researchers to study an unapproved drug or to study an approved drug for a new indication or in a new patient population.
- Emergency Use INDs, also called compassionate use or single-patient INDs, are filed for emergency use of an unapproved drug when the clinical situation does not allow sufficient time to submit an IND in accordance with 21 CFR §§ 312.23, 312.24. These are most commonly used for life-threatening conditions for which there is no standard treatment.
- Treatment INDs are filed to make a drug available for the treatment of serious or immediately life-threatening conditions prior to FDA approval. Serious diseases or conditions are stroke, schizophrenia, rheumatoid arthritis, osteoarthritis, chronic depression, seizures, Alzheimer's dementia, amyotrophic lateral sclerosis (ALS), and narcolepsy.
- Screening INDs are filed for multiple, closely related compounds in order to screen for the preferred compounds or formulations. The preferred compound can then be developed under a separate IND. Used for screening different salts, esters and other drug derivatives that are chemically different, but pharmacodynamically similar.

== Application ==
The IND application may be divided into the following categories:

1. Preclinical testing consists of animal pharmacology and toxicology studies to assess whether the drug is safe for testing in humans. Also included are any previous experience with the drug in humans (often foreign use).
2. Manufacturing Information includes composition, manufacturer, and stability of, and the controls used for, manufacturing the drug. Used to ensure that the company can adequately produce and supply consistent batches of the drug.
3. Investigator information on the qualifications of clinical investigators, that is, the professionals (generally physicians) who oversee the administration of the experimental drug to the study subjects. Used to assess whether the investigators are qualified to fulfill their clinical trial duties.
4. Clinical trial protocols are the centerpiece of the IND. Detailed protocols for proposed clinical studies to assess whether the initial-phase trials will expose the subjects to unnecessary risks.
5. Other commitments are commitments to obtain informed consent from the research subjects, to obtain a review of the study by an institutional review board (IRB), and to adhere to the investigational new drug regulations.

An IND application must also include an Investigator's Brochure intended to educate the trial investigators of the significant facts about the trial drug they need to know to conduct their clinical trial with the least hazard to the subjects or patients.

Once an IND application is submitted, the FDA has 30 days to object to the IND or it automatically becomes effective and clinical trials may begin. If the FDA detects a problem, it may place a clinical hold on the IND, prohibiting the start of the clinical studies until the problem is resolved, as outlined in 21 CFR 312.42.

An IND must be labeled "Caution: New Drug – Limited by Federal (or United States) law to investigational use", per 21 CFR 312.6

== Prevalence ==
Approximately two-thirds of both INDs and new drug applications (NDAs) are small-molecule drugs. The rest is biopharmaceuticals. About half of the INDs fail in preclinical and clinical phases of drug development.

== Examples ==
The FDA runs a medical marijuana IND program (the Compassionate Investigational New Drug program). It stopped accepting new patients in 1992 after public health authorities concluded there was no scientific value to it, and due to President George H. W. Bush administration's desire to "get tough on crime and drugs." As of 2011, four patients continue to receive cannabis from the government under the program.

Sanctioned by Executive Order 13139, the US Department of Defense employed an anthrax vaccine classified as an investigational new drug (IND) in its Anthrax Vaccine Immunization Program (AVIP).

== See also ==
- Abigail Alliance for Better Access to Developmental Drugs
- Animal drug
- Biologics license application
- Drug discovery
- FDA Fast Track Development Program
- Good Manufacturing Practice
- Inverse benefit law
- Lists of investigational drugs
- Orphan drug
- TOL101
