= HIST1H2BE =

Protein-coding gene in the species Homo sapiens

H2BC6

Identifiers
- Aliases: H2BC6, H2B.h, H2B/h, H2BFH, dJ221C16.8, histone cluster 1, H2be, histone cluster 1 H2B family member e, HIST1H2BE, H2B clustered histone 6, H2BC10, H2BC8, H2BC7, H2BC4
- External IDs: OMIM: 602805; MGI: 2448403; GeneCards: H2BC6
Available structures
PDB	Ortholog search: PDBe RCSB
PDB	List of PDB id codes 5KGF

Gene location (Human)
Chr.	Chromosome 6 (human)
Band	6p22.2	Start	26,172,059 bp
Band	6p22.2	End	26,184,655 bp

Gene location (Mouse)
Chr.	Chromosome 13 (mouse)
Band	13|13 A3.1	Start	21,899,933 bp
Band	13|13 A3.1	End	21,900,313 bp
RNA expression pattern
Bgee	Human / Mouse (ortholog); Top expressed in: tendon of biceps brachii; bone marrow cell; right ventricle; testicle; Achilles tendon; oocyte; epithelium of colon; cartilage tissue; thymus; internal globus pallidus / Top expressed in: genital tubercle; uterus; tail of embryo; spermatid; bone marrow; zygote; embryo; embryo; spermatocyte; morula; More reference expression data
BioGPS	n/a
Gene ontology
Molecular function	DNA binding; protein binding; protein heterodimerization activity; identical protein binding
Cellular component	chromosome; nucleosome; extracellular exosome; nucleus; nucleoplasm; extracellular space; cytosol
Biological process	nucleosome assembly; innate immune response in mucosa; defense response to bacterium; protein ubiquitination; antimicrobial humoral immune response mediated by antimicrobial peptide
Sources:Amigo / QuickGO
Orthologs
Databases	NCBI: entry; OMA: entry
Species	Human	Mouse
Entrez	8344	319185
Ensembl	ENSG00000274290	ENSMUSG00000094338
UniProt	P62807	P10853
RefSeq (mRNA)	NM_003523	NM_178199
RefSeq (protein)	NP_003517; NP_001368918	NP_835505; NP_001091448; NP_001300809; NP_001104025; NP_001300807 NP_835502; NP_835506; NP_835508
Location (UCSC)	Chr 6: 26.17 – 26.18 Mb	Chr 13: 21.9 – 21.9 Mb
PubMed search
- Wikidata
View/Edit Human	View/Edit Mouse

Histone H2B type 1-C/E/F/G/I is a protein that in humans is encoded by the HIST1H2BE gene.

== Function ==
Histones are basic nuclear proteins that are responsible for the nucleosome structure of the chromosomal fiber in eukaryotes. Two molecules of each of the four core histones (H2A, H2B, H3, and H4) form an octamer, around which approximately 146 bp of DNA is wrapped in repeating units, called nucleosomes.

The linker histone, H1, interacts with linker DNA between nucleosomes and functions in the compaction of chromatin into higher order structures. This gene is intronless and encodes a member of the histone H2B family. Transcripts from this gene lack polyA tails but instead contain a palindromic termination element. This gene is found in the large histone gene cluster on chromosome 6.
