= HIST1H2BN =

Protein-coding gene in the species Homo sapiens

H2BC15
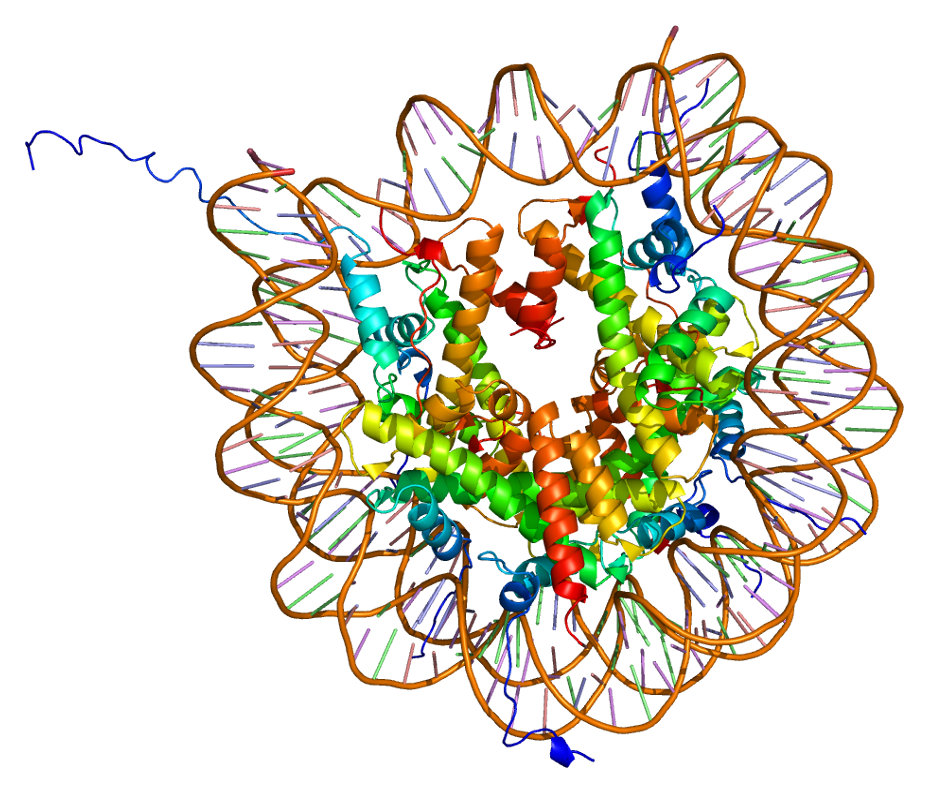

Identifiers
- Aliases: H2BC15, H2B/d, H2BFD, histone cluster 1, H2bn, histone cluster 1 H2B family member n, H2B clustered histone 15, HIST1H2BN
- External IDs: OMIM: 602801; MGI: 2448404; GeneCards: H2BC15

Gene location (Human)
Chr.	Chromosome 6 (human)
Band	6p22.1	Start	27,838,545 bp
Band	6p22.1	End	27,855,709 bp

Gene location (Mouse)
Chr.	Chromosome 13 (mouse)
Band	13|13 A3.1	Start	21,906,214 bp
Band	13|13 A3.1	End	21,906,737 bp
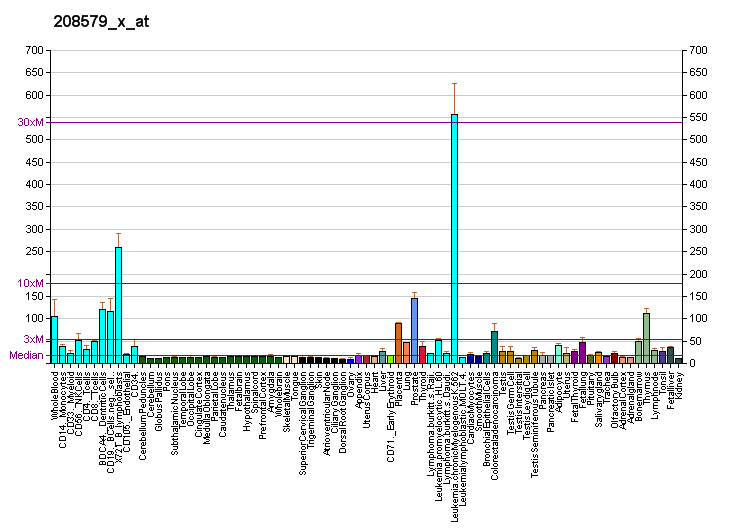

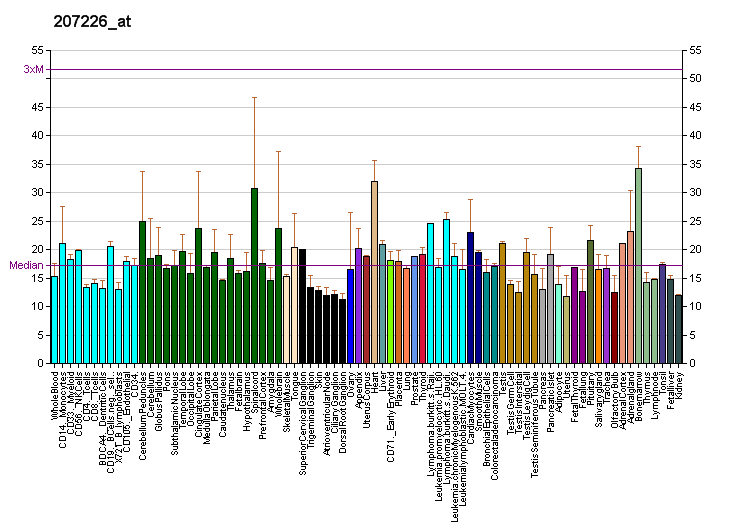
RNA expression pattern
Bgee	Human / Mouse (ortholog); Top expressed in: bone marrow cell; epithelium of colon; monocyte; Achilles tendon; stromal cell of endometrium; tonsil; ventricular zone; C1 segment; striated muscle tissue; skeletal muscle tissue / Top expressed in: spermatid; genital tubercle; spermatocyte; tail of embryo; uterus; zygote; embryo; embryo; bone marrow; morula; More reference expression data
BioGPS	More reference expression data
Gene ontology
Molecular function	DNA binding; protein heterodimerization activity
Cellular component	chromosome; nucleosome; extracellular exosome; nucleus; nucleoplasm; cytosol
Biological process	nucleosome assembly; protein ubiquitination
Sources:Amigo / QuickGO
Orthologs
Databases	NCBI: entry; OMA: entry
Species	Human	Mouse
Entrez	8341	319186
Ensembl	ENSG00000233822	ENSMUSG00000114279
UniProt	Q99877	P10854
RefSeq (mRNA)	NM_003520	NM_178200
RefSeq (protein)	NP_003511	NP_835507
Location (UCSC)	Chr 6: 27.84 – 27.86 Mb	Chr 13: 21.91 – 21.91 Mb
PubMed search
- Wikidata
View/Edit Human	View/Edit Mouse

Histone H2B type 1-N is a protein that in humans is encoded by the HIST1H2BN gene.

Histones are basic nuclear proteins that are responsible for the nucleosome structure of the chromosomal fiber in eukaryotes. Two molecules of each of the four core histones (H2A, H2B, H3, and H4) form an octamer, around which approximately 146 bp of DNA is wrapped in repeating units, called nucleosomes. The linker histone, H1, interacts with linker DNA between nucleosomes and functions in the compaction of chromatin into higher order structures. This gene is intronless and encodes a member of the histone H2B family. Transcripts from this gene lack polyA tails but instead contain a palindromic termination element. This gene is found in the small histone gene cluster on chromosome 6p22-p21.3.
