= CD3G =

Protein-coding gene in humans

Identifiers
- Aliases: CD3G, CD3-GAMMA, IMD17, T3G, CD3g molecule, CD3GAMMA, CD3 gamma subunit of T-cell receptor complex
- External IDs: OMIM: 186740; MGI: 88333; GeneCards: CD3G
Available structures
PDB	Ortholog search: PDBe RCSB
PDB	List of PDB id codes 1SY6

Gene location (Human)
Chr.	Chromosome 11 (human)
Band	11q23.3	Start	118,344,344 bp
Band	11q23.3	End	118,355,161 bp

Gene location (Mouse)
Chr.	Chromosome 9 (mouse)
Band	9 A5.2|9 24.84 cM	Start	44,880,870 bp
Band	9 A5.2|9 24.84 cM	End	44,891,729 bp
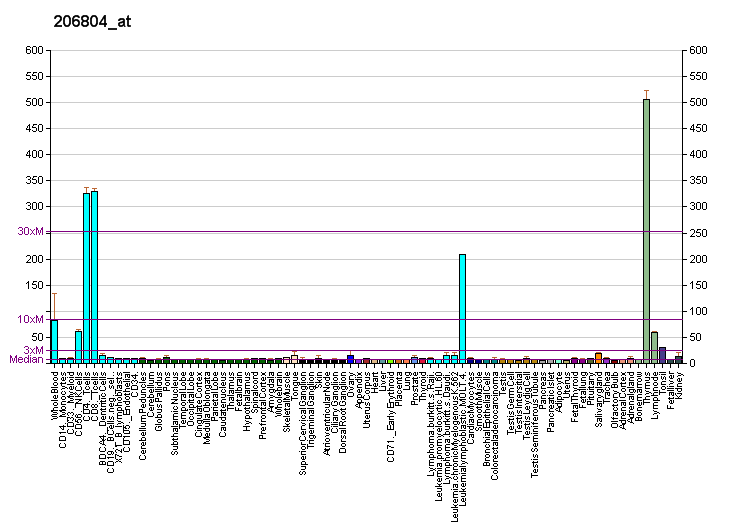
RNA expression pattern
Bgee	Human / Mouse (ortholog); Top expressed in: buccal mucosa cell; lymph node; thymus; granulocyte; blood; appendix; epithelium of colon; superficial temporal artery; testicle; bone marrow cell / Top expressed in: thymus; mesenteric lymph nodes; superior surface of tongue; gallbladder; blood; spleen; ankle joint; subcutaneous adipose tissue; duodenum; jejunum; More reference expression data
BioGPS	More reference expression data
Gene ontology
Molecular function	signaling receptor complex adaptor activity; T cell receptor binding; transmembrane signaling receptor activity; protein heterodimerization activity; protein homodimerization activity
Cellular component	integral component of membrane; alpha-beta T cell receptor complex; integral component of plasma membrane; T cell receptor complex; membrane; clathrin-coated vesicle membrane; plasma membrane; external side of plasma membrane
Biological process	protein transport; establishment or maintenance of cell polarity; cell surface receptor signaling pathway; T cell receptor signaling pathway; regulation of lymphocyte apoptotic process; T cell activation; Fc-gamma receptor signaling pathway involved in phagocytosis; regulation of immune response; membrane organization; protein homooligomerization; adaptive immune response; immune system process; protein-containing complex assembly; T cell differentiation; positive thymic T cell selection; positive regulation of signal transduction
Sources:Amigo / QuickGO
Orthologs
Databases	NCBI: entry; OMA: entry
Species	Human	Mouse
Entrez	917	12502
Ensembl	ENSG00000160654	ENSMUSG00000002033
UniProt	P09693	P11942
RefSeq (mRNA)	NM_000073	NM_009850
RefSeq (protein)	NP_000064	NP_033980
Location (UCSC)	Chr 11: 118.34 – 118.36 Mb	Chr 9: 44.88 – 44.89 Mb
PubMed search
- Wikidata
View/Edit Human	View/Edit Mouse

T-cell surface glycoprotein CD3 gamma chain is a protein that in humans is encoded by the CD3G gene.

T cell antigen receptor (TCR) is associated on the T cell surface with a complex of protein called CD3. CD3G (gamma chain) is one of the four peptides (gamma, delta, epsilon and zeta) that form CD3. Defects in CD3G are associated with T cell immunodeficiency.

== See also ==
- CD3 (immunology)
- Cluster of differentiation
