= CD8 =

Marker on immune cells

Putative T-cell surface glycoprotein CD8

Identifiers
- Symbol: CD8
- Membranome: 29

CD8a molecule

Identifiers
- Symbol: CD8A
- Alt. symbols: CD8
- NCBI gene: 925
- HGNC: 1706
- OMIM: 186910
- RefSeq: NM_001768
- UniProt: P01732

Other data
- Locus: Chr. 2 p12
Search for
- Structures: Swiss-model
- Domains: InterPro

CD8b molecule

Identifiers
- Symbol: CD8B
- Alt. symbols: CD8B1
- NCBI gene: 926
- HGNC: 1707
- OMIM: 186730
- RefSeq: NM_172099
- UniProt: P10966

Other data
- Locus: Chr. 2 p12
Search for
- Structures: Swiss-model
- Domains: InterPro

CD8 (cluster of differentiation 8) is a transmembrane glycoprotein that serves as a co-receptor for the T-cell receptor (TCR). Along with the TCR, the CD8 co-receptor plays a role in T cell signaling and aiding with cytotoxic T cell-antigen interactions.

Like the TCR, CD8 binds to a major histocompatibility complex (MHC) molecule, but is specific for the MHC class I protein. However, while the TCR interacts with the antigen-binding region of MHC-I, the CD8 molecule binds to the α3 domain, a non-variant region of MHC-I located away from the antigen-binding site.

== Tissue distribution ==
The CD8 co-receptor is predominantly expressed on the surface of cytotoxic T cells, but can also be found on natural killer cells, cortical thymocytes, and dendritic cells. The CD8 molecule is a marker for cytotoxic T cell population. It is expressed in T cell lymphoblastic lymphoma and hypo-pigmented mycosis fungoides.

== Structure ==
There are two isoforms of the protein, alpha (CD8A) and beta (CD8B), each encoded by a different gene. In humans, both genes are located on chromosome 2 in position 2p12. CD8A is composed of 235 amino acid residues while CD8B consists of 210 residues, these two molecules share only 25 conserved residues.

Both CD8 chains are type I membrane proteins, each with three main regions: an N-terminal extracellular ectodomain (residues 23–182 in CD8A and 23–170 in CD8B), a single transmembrane helix (residues 183–203 in CD8A and 171–191 in CD8B), and a small cytoplasmic region (residues 204–235 in CD8A and 192–210 in CD8B). The ectodomain of CD8 comprises a single immunoglobulin variable (IgV)-like domain and a highly dynamic proline-rich stalk region that connects the IgV domain to the transmembrane helix.

Active form of CD8 is dimer, three different dimers have been detected CD8αα, CD8αβ, and CD8ββ

CD8 chains contain several essential cysteine residues critical for their structural and functional roles. A disulfide bond between two cysteines in the IgV domain (C43-C115 in CD8A; C41-C116 in CD8B) is a defining feature of the immunoglobulin fold, stabilizing the two beta sheets that form this domain. Additionally, C181, the last residue of the stalk region in CD8A, is critical for the dimerization, since it forms an inter-subunit disulfide bond. In CD8αα dimers, it pairs with C181 of another CD8A monomer, while in CD8αβ dimers, it pairs with C168 of CD8B.

Cysteine residues in the transmembrane helix (TMH) of CD8A also play an important role in dimerization. Studies have shown that a chimeric CD8A containing the TMH of another protein, such as the interleukin-2 receptor, exhibits a significantly reduced dimeric form.

The cytosolic portion of CD8A (but not CD8B) contains two cysteine residues, Cys215 and Cys217, which are integral to the Lck recognition site. Together with a Zn²⁺ ion and two cysteines (Cys20 and Cys23) from Lck, these residues help position the kinase near the TCR to phosphorylate the ITAM regions of CD3 subunits.

Furthermore, other cysteine residues in the cytoplasmic regions of both CD8A and CD8B can undergo palmitoylation. Palmitoylation is crucial for targeting proteins to specialized membrane regions, including lipid rafts and immunological synapses. For CD8, palmitoylation facilitates the recruitment of Lck bound to CD8 to the immunological synapse, enhancing proximity to the ITAM regions of CD3 and promoting efficient TCR signaling.

The first crystal structure of the deglycosylated IgV domain of the CD8A molecule was published by Leahy, DJ, Axel, R, and Hendrickson, WA in 1992. Since then, crystal structures have been determined for over 20 different complexes containing CD8 molecules. The extracellular immunoglobulin-like domain of CD8 monomers adopts a typical IgV fold, composed of two beta sheets (strands ABED and A'G'GFCC'C''). Hydrophobic interaction between residues at the interface of these two β-sheets together with a disulfide bond linking cysteine residues in strands B and F, create a stable domain. Loops between strands B and C (CDR1), C' and C'' (CDR2) and F and G (CDR3) mediate contact with the MHC-I. Comparison of the CD8αα and CD8αβ dimers demonstrates the overall similarity of the structure, though the dimer interface of CD8αα is a little bit larger compared with CD8αβ. Moreover, the interaction with MHC-I is very similar for CD8αα and CD8αβ. CDR loops of both subunits of CD8 dimer interact with a flexible region at the α_{3} domain of an MHC-I molecule (residues 223 and 230). Importance of this interaction was confirmed by the mutational study

Schematic representation of the heterodimeric CD8 co-receptor

== Function ==
The interaction of the extracellular IgV-like domains of CD8 with the α_{3} portion of the Class I MHC molecule increases affinity for the T cell receptor of the cytotoxic T cell and the target cell such that they bound closely together during antigen-specific activation. In addition, CD8 co-receptor also plays a role in T cell signaling. The cytoplasmic tail of the CD8 co-receptor bind Lck (lymphocyte-specific protein tyrosine kinase) via common Cys_{4}-Zn finger. Once the T cell receptor binds its specific antigen Lck phosphorylates the cytoplasmic CD3 and ζ-chains of the TCR complex which initiates a cascade of phosphorylation eventually leading to activation of transcription factors like NFAT, NF-κB, and AP-1 which affect the expression of certain genes.
