= T-cell surface glycoprotein CD3 epsilon chain =

Protein-coding gene in the species Homo sapiens

CD3E
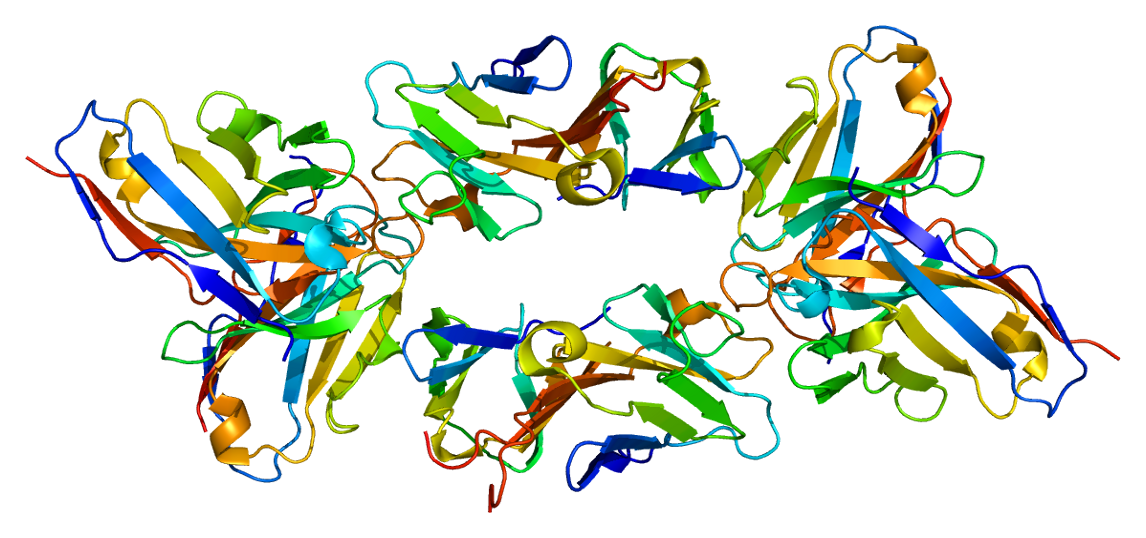

Identifiers
- Aliases: CD3E, IMD18, T3E, TCRE, CD3e molecule, CD3epsilon, CD3 epsilon subunit of T-cell receptor complex
- External IDs: OMIM: 186830; MGI: 88332; GeneCards: CD3E
Available structures
PDB	Ortholog search: PDBe RCSB
PDB	List of PDB id codes 1A81, 1SY6, 1XIW, 2ROL

Gene location (Human)
Chr.	Chromosome 11 (human)
Band	11q23.3	Start	118,304,730 bp
Band	11q23.3	End	118,316,175 bp

Gene location (Mouse)
Chr.	Chromosome 9 (mouse)
Band	9 A5.2|9 24.84 cM	Start	44,910,038 bp
Band	9 A5.2|9 24.84 cM	End	44,920,925 bp
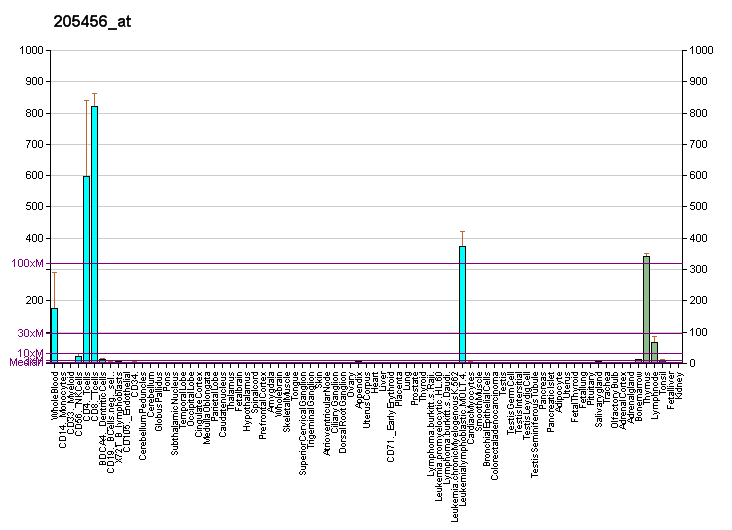
RNA expression pattern
Bgee	Human / Mouse (ortholog); Top expressed in: granulocyte; appendix; lymph node; spleen; blood; epithelium of colon; thymus; gallbladder; rectum; mucosa of transverse colon / Top expressed in: thymus; blood; morula; blastocyst; mesenteric lymph nodes; spleen; pharynx; subcutaneous adipose tissue; duodenum; jejunum; More reference expression data
BioGPS	More reference expression data
Gene ontology
Molecular function	SH3 domain binding; signal transducer activity; protein binding; protein heterodimerization activity; signaling receptor complex adaptor activity; T cell receptor binding; protein kinase binding; transmembrane signaling receptor activity; protein homodimerization activity
Cellular component	integral component of membrane; membrane; cell-cell junction; alpha-beta T cell receptor complex; plasma membrane; integral component of plasma membrane; T cell receptor complex; immunological synapse; external side of plasma membrane; dendritic spine; cell body
Biological process	regulation of apoptotic process; G protein-coupled receptor signaling pathway; positive regulation of calcium-mediated signaling; negative regulation of smoothened signaling pathway; T cell differentiation in thymus; response to nutrient; transmembrane receptor protein tyrosine kinase signaling pathway; immune system process; T cell costimulation; positive regulation of interferon-gamma production; signal complex assembly; negative regulation of gene expression; positive regulation of interleukin-4 production; negative thymic T cell selection; cell surface receptor signaling pathway; positive regulation of gene expression; positive regulation of T cell anergy; positive regulation of T cell activation; positive regulation of T cell proliferation; positive regulation of alpha-beta T cell proliferation; positive regulation of peptidyl-tyrosine phosphorylation; regulation of immune response; apoptotic signaling pathway; lymphocyte activation; T cell receptor signaling pathway; T cell activation; protein homooligomerization; dendrite development; cerebellum development; adaptive immune response; protein-containing complex assembly; positive regulation of cell-matrix adhesion; T cell differentiation; positive regulation of cell-cell adhesion mediated by integrin; positive thymic T cell selection
Sources:Amigo / QuickGO
Orthologs
Databases	NCBI: entry; OMA: entry
Species	Human	Mouse
Entrez	916	12501
Ensembl	ENSG00000198851	ENSMUSG00000032093
UniProt	P07766	P22646
RefSeq (mRNA)	NM_000733	NM_007648
RefSeq (protein)	NP_000724	NP_031674
Location (UCSC)	Chr 11: 118.3 – 118.32 Mb	Chr 9: 44.91 – 44.92 Mb
PubMed search
- Wikidata
View/Edit Human	View/Edit Mouse

CD3e molecule, epsilon also known as CD3E is a polypeptide which in humans is encoded by the CD3E gene which resides on chromosome 11.

== Function ==
The protein encoded by this gene is the CD3-epsilon polypeptide, which together with CD3-gamma, -delta and -zeta, and the T-cell receptor alpha/beta and gamma/delta heterodimers, forms the T cell receptor-CD3 complex. This complex plays an important role in coupling antigen recognition to several intracellular signal-transduction pathways. The genes encoding the epsilon, gamma and delta polypeptides are located in the same cluster on chromosome 11. The epsilon polypeptide plays an essential role in T-cell development.

== Clinical significance ==
Defects in this gene cause severe immunodeficiency. This gene has also been linked to a susceptibility to type I diabetes in women.

== Interactions ==
T-cell surface glycoprotein CD3 epsilon chain has been shown to interact with TOP2B, CD3EAP and NCK2.

== See also ==
- CD3 (immunology)
- Cluster of differentiation
