= CD3D =

Protein-coding gene in humans

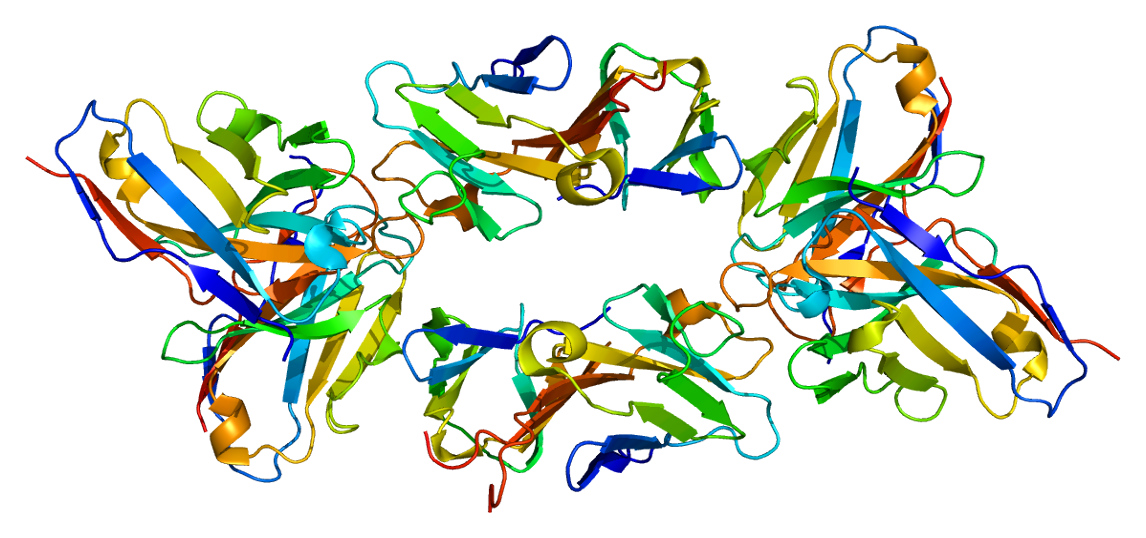

Identifiers
- Aliases: CD3D, CD3-DELTA, IMD19, T3D, CD3d molecule, CD3 delta subunit of T-cell receptor complex, CD3DELTA
- External IDs: OMIM: 186790; MGI: 88331; GeneCards: CD3D
Available structures
| PDB | Ortholog search: PDBe RCSB |
| PDB | List of PDB id codes 1XIW |

Gene location (Human)
| Chr. | Chromosome 11 (human) |
| Band | 11q23.3 | Start | 118,339,075 bp |
| Band | 11q23.3 | End | 118,342,705 bp |

Gene location (Mouse)
| Chr. | Chromosome 9 (mouse) |
| Band | 9 A5.2|9 24.84 cM | Start | 44,893,084 bp |
| Band | 9 A5.2|9 24.84 cM | End | 44,898,637 bp |
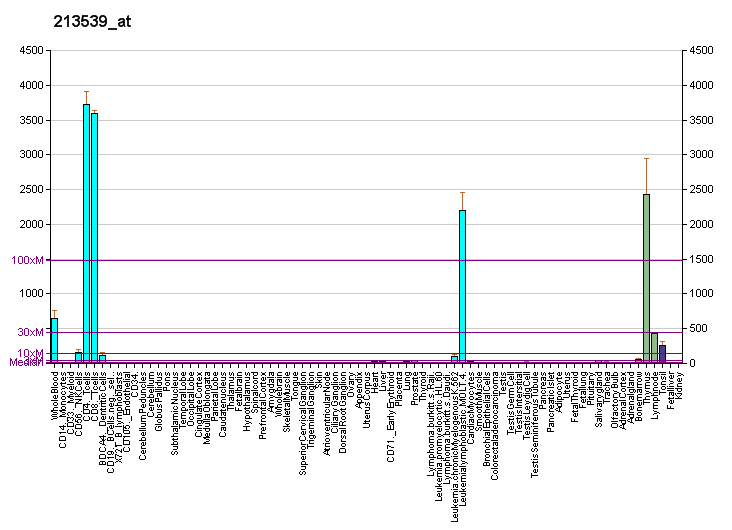
RNA expression pattern
| Bgee | Human / Mouse (ortholog); Top expressed in: thymus; granulocyte; lymph node; appendix; blood; spleen; epithelium of nasopharynx; testicle; mucosa of ileum; bone marrow / Top expressed in: thymus; mesenteric lymph nodes; blood; spleen; granulocyte; subcutaneous adipose tissue; pharynx; right lung lobe; spermatid; superior surface of tongue; More reference expression data |
| BioGPS | More reference expression data |
Gene ontology
| Molecular function | transcription coactivator activity; protein heterodimerization activity; transmembrane signaling receptor activity; protein homodimerization activity |
| Cellular component | membrane; cytoplasm; alpha-beta T cell receptor complex; integral component of membrane; T cell receptor complex; clathrin-coated vesicle membrane; plasma membrane; external side of plasma membrane |
| Biological process | positive regulation of transcription by RNA polymerase II; regulation of immune response; T cell receptor signaling pathway; T cell differentiation; positive thymic T cell selection; cell surface receptor signaling pathway; membrane organization; protein homooligomerization; adaptive immune response; immune system process |
Sources:Amigo / QuickGO
Orthologs
| Databases | NCBI: entry; OMA: entry |
| Species | Human | Mouse |
| Entrez | 915 | 12500 |
| Ensembl | ENSG00000167286 | ENSMUSG00000032094 |
| UniProt | P04234 | P04235 |
| RefSeq (mRNA) | NM_001040651; NM_000732 | NM_013487 |
| RefSeq (protein) | NP_000723; NP_001035741 | NP_038515 |
| Location (UCSC) | Chr 11: 118.34 – 118.34 Mb | Chr 9: 44.89 – 44.9 Mb |
| PubMed search |
- Wikidata
| View/Edit Human | View/Edit Mouse |

T-cell surface glycoprotein CD3 delta chain is a protein that in humans is encoded by the CD3D gene.

== Interactions ==
CD3D has been shown to interact with CD8A.

== See also ==
- CD3 (immunology)
- Cluster of differentiation
