= Adoptive cell transfer =

Medical therapy involving transplant of cells expanded ex vivo

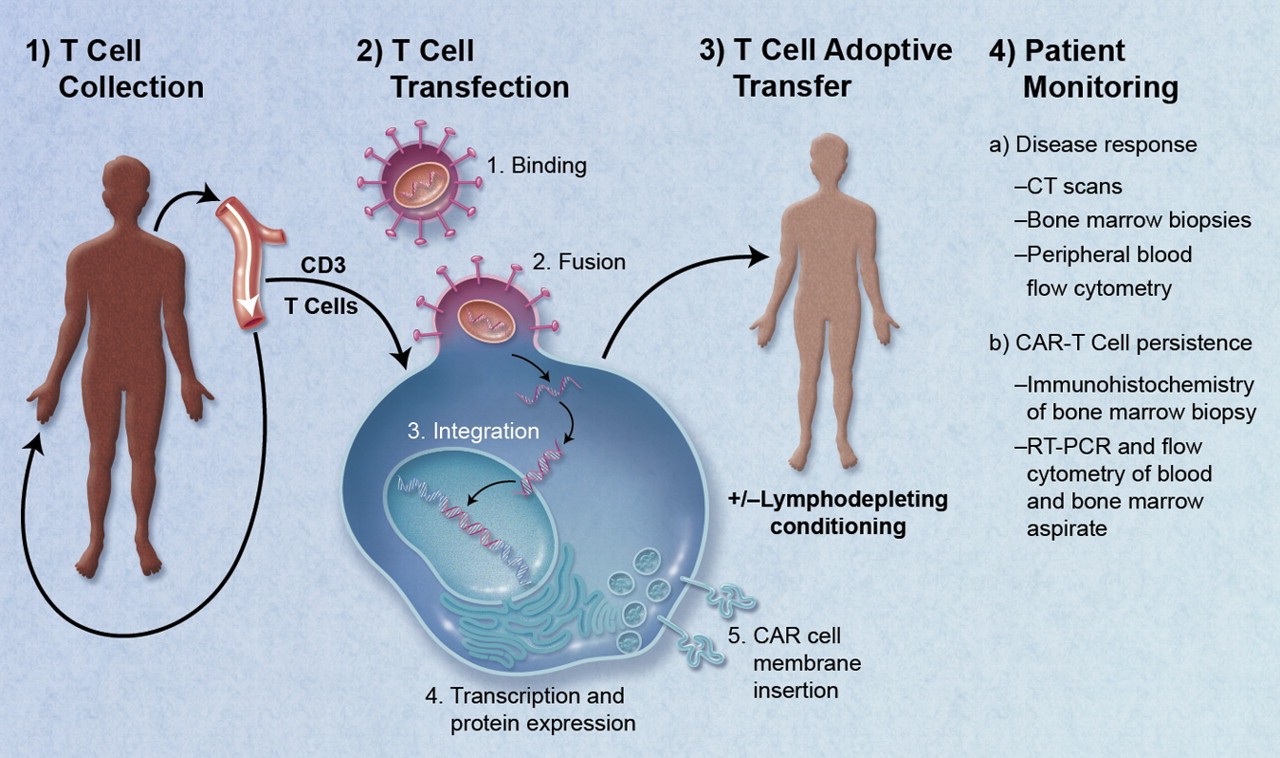
CAR-engineered T-cell adoptive transfer

Adoptive cell transfer (ACT) is the transfer of cells into a patient. The cells may have originated from the patient or from another individual. The cells are most commonly derived from the immune system with the goal of improving immune functionality and characteristics. In autologous cancer immunotherapy, T cells are extracted from the patient, genetically modified and cultured in vitro and returned to the same patient. Comparatively, allogeneic therapies involve cells isolated and expanded from a donor separate from the patient receiving the cells.

== History ==
In the 1960s, lymphocytes were discovered to be the mediators of allograft rejection in animals. Attempts to use T cells to treat transplanted murine tumors required cultivating and manipulating T cells in culture. Syngeneic lymphocytes were transferred from rodents heavily immunized against the tumor to inhibit growth of small established tumors, becoming the first example of ACT.

Description of T cell growth factor interleukin-2 (IL-2) in 1976 allowed T lymphocytes to be grown in vitro, often without loss of effector functions. High doses of IL-2 could inhibit tumor growth in mice. 1982, studies demonstrated that intravenous immune lymphocytes could treat bulky subcutaneous FBL3 lymphomas. Administration of IL-2 after cell transfer enhanced therapeutic potential.

In 1985 IL-2 administration produced durable tumor regressions in some patients with metastatic melanoma. Lymphocytes infiltrating the stroma of growing, transplantable tumors provided a concentrated source of tumor-infiltrating lymphocytes (TIL) and could stimulate regression of established lung and liver tumors. In 1986, human TILs from resected melanomas were found to contain cells that could recognize autologous tumors. In 1988 autologous TILs were shown to reduce metastatic melanoma tumors. Tumor-derived TILs are generally mixtures of CD8^{+} and CD4^{+} T cells with few major contaminating cells.

In 1989 Zelig Eshhar published the first study in which a T cell's targeting receptor was replaced, and noted that this could be used to direct T cells to attack any kind of cell; this is the essential biotechnology underlying CAR-T therapy.

Responses were often of short duration and faded days after administration. In 2002, lymphodepletion using a nonmyeloablative chemotherapy regimen administered immediately before TIL transfer increased cancer regression, as well as the persistent oligoclonal repopulation of the host with the transferred lymphocytes. In some patients, the administered antitumor cells represented up to 80% of the CD8^{+} T cells months after the infusion.

Initially, melanoma was the only cancer that reproducibly yielded useful TIL cultures. In 2006 administration of normal circulating lymphocytes transduced with a retrovirus encoding a T-cell receptor (TCR) that recognized the MART-1 melanoma-melanocyte antigen, mediated tumor regression. In 2010 administration of lymphocytes genetically engineered to express a chimeric antibody receptor (CAR) against B cell antigen CD19 was shown to mediate regression of an advanced B cell lymphoma.

By 2010, doctors had begun experimental treatments for leukemia patients using CD19-targeted T cells with added DNA to stimulate cell division. As of 2015 trials had treated about 350 leukemia and lymphoma patients. Antigen CD19 appears only on B cells, which go awry in lymphoma and leukemia. Loss of B cells can be countered with immunoglobulin.

Startups including Juno Therapeutics exploit the combination of aggressive tumors and FDA willingness to approve potential therapies for such ailments to accelerate approvals for new therapies.

In checkpoint therapy, antibodies bind to molecules involved in T-cell regulation to remove inhibitory pathways that block T-cell responses, known as immune checkpoint therapy.

As of 2015 the technique had expanded to treat cervical cancer, lymphoma, leukemia, bile duct cancer and neuroblastoma and in 2016, lung cancer, breast cancer, sarcoma and melanoma. In 2016, CD19-specific chimeric antigen receptor (CAR)-modified T cells were used to treat patients with relapsed and refractory CD19+ B cell malignancies, including B cell acute lymphoblastic leukemia (B-ALL) harboring rearrangement of the mixed lineage leukemia (MLL) gene with CD19 CAR-T cells.

In 2016, researchers developed a technique that used cancer cells' RNA to produce T cells and an immune response. They encased the RNA in a negatively charged fatty membrane. In vivo, this electrical charge guided the particles towards the patient's dendritic immune cells that specify immune system targets.

In 2017, researchers announced the first use of donor cells (rather than the patients' own cells) to defeat leukemia in two infants for whom other treatments had failed. The cells had four genetic modifications. Two were made using TALENs. One changed the cells so that they did not attack all the cells of another person. Another modification made tumor cells their target.

As of February 2024, 27 advanced cell therapy products (CTPs) were approved by FDA. These included hematopoietic stem cell products (Hemacord, Clinimmune, Ducord, Lifesouth, Bloodworks, Allocord, Clevecord, and Omisirge); CART products (Kymriah, Yescarta, Tecartus, Breyanzi, Abecma, and Carvykti); gene therapies Zynteglo, Casgevy, Skysona, and Lyfgenia; and various other cell therapy products (Provenge, Laviv, Gintuit, Maci, Stratagraft, Rethymic, Lantidra, and Amtagvi).

== Process ==
In melanoma, a resected melanoma specimen is digested into a single-cell suspension or divided into multiple tumor fragments. The result is individually grown in IL-2. Lymphocytes overgrow. They destroy the tumors in the sample within 2 to 3 weeks. They then produce pure cultures of lymphocytes that can be tested for reactivity against other tumors, in coculture assays. Individual cultures are then expanded in the presence of IL-2 and excess irradiated anti-CD3 antibodies. The latter targets the epsilon subunit within the human CD3 complex of the TCR. 5–6 weeks after resecting the tumor, up to 10^{11} lymphocytes can be obtained.

Prior to infusion, a lymphodepleting preparative regimen is undergone, typically 60 mg/kg cyclophosphamide for 2 days and 25 mg/m^{2} fludarabine administered for 5 days. This substantially increases infused cell persistence and the incidence and duration of clinical responses. Then cells and IL-2 at 720,000 IU/kg to tolerance are infused.

Interleukin-21 may play an important role in enhancing the efficacy of T cell based in vitro therapies.

In early trials, preparing engineered T cells cost $75,000 to manufacture cells for each patient.

Interleukin-2 is normally added to the extracted T cells to boost their effectiveness, but in high doses it can have a toxic effect. The reduced number of injected T cells is accompanied by reduced IL-2, thereby reducing side effects. In vitro tests on melanoma and kidney cancer models met expectations.

In 2016 Strep-tag II sequences were introduced into synthetic CAR or natural T-cell receptors to serve as a marker for identification, rapid purification, tailoring spacer length for optimal function and selective, antibody-coated, microbead-driven, large-scale expansion. This facilitates cGMP manufacturing of pure populations of engineered T cells and enables in vivo tracking and retrieval of transferred cells for downstream research applications.

== Genetic engineering ==
Antitumor receptors genetically engineered into normal T cells can be used for therapy. T cells can be redirected by the integration of genes encoding either conventional alpha-beta TCRs or CARs. CARs (Chimeric Antibody Receptors) were pioneered in the late 1980s and can be constructed by linking the variable regions of the antibody heavy and light chains to intracellular signaling chains such as CD3-zeta, potentially including costimulatory domains encoding CD28 or CD137. CARs can provide recognition of cell surface components not restricted to major histocompatibility complexes (MHC). They can be introduced into T cells with high efficiency using viral vectors.

== Correlations between T cell differentiation status, cellular persistence, and treatment outcomes ==
Improved antitumor responses have been seen in mouse and monkey models using T cells in early differentiation stages (such as naïve or central memory cells). CD8^{+} T cells follow a progressive pathway of differentiation from naïve T cells into stem cell memory, central memory, effector memory, and ultimately terminally differentiated effector T cell populations. CD8^{+} T cells paradoxically lose antitumor power as they acquire the ability to lyse target cells and to produce the cytokine interferon-γ, qualities otherwise thought to be important for antitumor efficacy. Differentiation state is inversely related to proliferation and persistence. Age is negatively correlated with clinical effectiveness. CD8^{+} T cells can exist in a stem cell–like state, capable of clonal proliferation. Human T memory stem cells express a gene program that enables them to proliferate extensively and differentiate into other T cell populations.

CD4^{+} T cells can also promote tumor rejection. CD4^{+} T cells enhance CD8^{+} T cell function and can directly destroy tumor cells. Evidence suggests that T helper 17 cells can promote sustained antitumor immunity.

== Intrinsic (Intracellular) checkpoint blockade ==
Other modes of enhancing immuno-therapy include targeting so-called intrinsic immune checkpoint blockades. Many of these intrinsic regulators include molecules with ubiquitin ligase activity, including CBLB. More recently, CISH, a molecule with ubiquitin ligase activity, was found to be induced by T cell receptor ligation (TCR) and suppressed by targeting the critical signaling intermediate PLC-gamma-1. The deletion of CISH in effector T cells dramatically augments TCR signaling and subsequent effector cytokine release, proliferation and survival. The adoptive transfer of tumor-specific effector T cells knocked out or knocked down CISH, resulting in a significant increase in functional avidity and sustained tumor immunity. Surprisingly no changes in activity of STAT5, CISH's purported target. Thus CISH represents a new class of T-cell intrinsic immunologic checkpoints with the potential to enhance adoptive immunotherapies.

== Context ==
Neither tumor bulk nor metastasis site affect the likelihood of achieving a complete cancer regression. Of 34 complete responders in two trials, one recurred. Only one patient with complete regression received more than one treatment. Prior treatment with targeted therapy using Braf inhibitor vemurafenib (Zelboraf) did not affect the likelihood that melanoma patients would experience an objective response. Prior failed immunotherapies did not reduce the odds of objective response.

== Stem cells ==
An emerging treatment modality for various diseases is the transfer of stem cells. Clinically, this approach has been exploited to transfer either immune-promoting or tolerogenic cells (often lymphocytes) to either enhance immunity against viruses and cancer or to promote tolerance in the setting of autoimmune disease, such as Type I diabetes or rheumatoid arthritis. Cells used in adoptive therapy may be genetically modified using recombinant DNA technology. One example of this in the case of T cell adoptive therapy is the addition of CARs to redirect the specificity of cytotoxic and helper T cells.

== Applications ==
=== Cancer ===
The adoptive transfer of autologous tumor infiltrating lymphocytes (TIL) or genetically re-directed peripheral blood mononuclear cells has been used experimentally to treat patients with advanced solid tumors, including melanoma and colorectal carcinoma, as well as patients with CD19-expressing hematologic malignancies, cervical cancer, lymphoma, leukemia, bile duct cancer and neuroblastoma, lung cancer, breast cancer, sarcoma, melanoma, relapsed and refractory CD19+ B cell malignancies, including B cell acute lymphoblastic leukemia (B-ALL) harboring rearrangement of the mixed lineage leukemia (MLL).

=== Autoimmune disease ===
The transfer of regulatory T cells has been used to treat Type 1 diabetes and others.

== Trial results ==
Trials began in the 1990s and accelerated beginning in 2010.

Cells	Year	Cancer histology	Molecular target	Patients	Number of ORs	Comments
Tumor-infiltrating lymphocytes*	1998	Melanoma		20	55%	Original use TIL ACT
	1994	Melanoma		86	34%	
	2002	Melanoma		13	46%	Lymphodepletion before cell transfer
	2011	Melanoma		93	56%	20% CR beyond 5 years
	2012	Melanoma		31	48%	
	2012	Melanoma		13	38%	Intention to treat: 26% OR rate
	2013	Melanoma		57	40%	Intention to treat: 29% OR rate
	2014	Cervical cancer		9	22%	Probably targeting HPV antigens
	2014	Bile duct	Mutated ERB2	1	–	Selected to target a somatic mutation
In vitro sensitization	2008	Melanoma	NY-ESO-1	9	33%	Clones reactive against cancer-testes antigens
	2014	Leukemia	WT-1	11	–	Many treated at high risk for relapse
Genetically engineered with CARs	2010	Lymphoma	CD19	1	100%	First use of anti-CD19 CAR
	2011	CLL	CD19	3	100%	Lentivirus used for transduction
	2013	ALL	CD19	5	100%	Four of five then underwent allo-HSCT
	2014	ALL	CD19	30	90%	CR in 90%
	2014	Lymphoma		15	80%	Four of seven CR in DLBCL
	2014	ALL	CD19	16	88%	Many moved to allo-HSCT
	2014	ALL	CD19	21	67%	Dose-escalation study
	2011	Neuroblastoma	GD2	11	27%	CR2 CARs into EBV-reactive cells
	2016	ALL	CD19	30	93%	J Clin Invest. 2016;126(6):2123–2138.
Genetically engineered with TCRs	2011	Synovial sarcoma	NY-ESO-1	6	67%	First report targeting nonmelanoma solid tumor
	2006	Melanoma	MART-1	11	45%	

== Solid tumors ==
Several ongoing clinical trials of adoptive cell therapies are ongoing in solid tumors, but challenges in the development of such therapies for this type of malignancy include the lack of surface antigens that are not found on essential normal tissues, difficult-to-penetrate tumor stroma, and factors in the tumor microenvironment that impede the activity of the immune system.

== Safety ==
=== Toxicity ===
Targeting normal, nonmutated antigenic targets that are expressed on normal tissues, but overexpressed on tumors has led to severe on-target, off-tumor toxicity. Toxicity was encountered in patients who received high-avidity TCRs that recognized either the MART-1 or gp100 melanoma-melanocyte antigens, in mice when targeting melanocyte antigens, in patients with renal cancer using a CAR targeting carbonic anhydrase 9 and in patients with metastatic colorectal cancer.

Toxicities can also result when previously unknown cross-reactivities are seen that target normal self-proteins expressed in vital organs. Cancer-testes antigen MAGE-A3 is not known to be expressed in any normal tissues. However, targeting an HLA-A*0201–restricted peptide in MAGE-A3 caused severe damage to gray matter in the brain, because this TCR also recognized a different but related epitope that is expressed at low levels in the brain. That CARs are potentially toxic to self-antigens was observed after infusion of CAR T cells specific for ERBB2. Two patients died when treated with an HLA-A1–restricted MAGE-A3–specific TCR whose affinity was enhanced by a site-specific mutagenesis.

Cancer-testis antigens are a family of intracellular proteins that are expressed during fetal development, but with little expression in normal adult tissues. More than 100 such molecules are epigenetically up-regulated in from 10 to 80% of cancer types. However, they lack high levels of protein expression. Approximately 10% of common cancers appear to express enough protein to be of interest for antitumor T cells. Low levels of some cancer-testes antigens are expressed in normal tissues, with associated toxicities. The NYESO-1 cancer-testes antigen has been targeted via a human TCR transduced into autologous cells. ORs were seen in 5 of 11 patients with metastatic melanoma and 4 of 6 patients with highly refractory synovial cell sarcoma.

"Suicide switches" let doctors kill engineered T cells in emergencies which threaten patient survival.

=== Cytokine release syndrome ===
Cytokine release syndrome is another side effect and can be a function of therapeutic effectiveness. As the tumor is destroyed, it releases large quantities of cell signaling protein molecules. This effect killed at least seven patients.

=== B cells ===
Molecules shared among tumors and nonessential normal organs represent potential ACT targets, despite the related toxicity. For example, the CD19 molecule is expressed on more than 90% of B cell malignancies and on non-plasma B cells at all differentiation stages and has been successfully used to treat patients with follicular lymphoma, large-cell lymphomas, chronic lymphocytic leukemia and acute lymphoblastic leukemia. Toxicity against CD19 results in B cell loss in circulation and in bone marrow that can be overcome by periodic immunoglobulin infusions.

Multiple other B cell antigens are being studied as targets, including CD22, CD23, ROR-1 and the immunoglobulin light-chain idiotype expressed by the individual cancer. CARs targeting either CD33 or CD123 have been studied as a therapy for patients with acute myeloid leukemia, though the expression of these molecules on normal precursors can lead to prolonged myeloablation. BCMA is a tumor necrosis factor receptor family protein expressed on mature B cells and plasma cells and can be targeted on multiple myeloma.
