= John Theurer Cancer Center =

Coordinates: 40.8843°N 74.0533°W

Geography
- Location: 92 2nd Street, Hackensack, New Jersey, United States

Organization
- Type: Cancer treatment
- Affiliated university: Hackensack University Medical Center Georgetown Lombardi Comprehensive Cancer Center Memorial Sloan Kettering Cancer Center
- Network: Hackensack Meridian Health

Links
- Lists: Hospitals in the United States

John Theurer Cancer Center (JTCC) at the Hackensack University Medical Center (HUMC), and part of Hackensack Meridian Health (HMH), specialises in oncology services and treatments. It is known for being the first site approved to use cell-based gene therapy to treat patients with certain types of large B-cell lymphoma who have not responded or relapsed after at least two other kinds of treatment; it initiated the first CAR T-cell therapy clinical trials and is a member of the NCI-approved Georgetown Lombardi Comprehensive Cancer Center. Other areas of concentration include bone marrow transplants, stem cell transplantation, lymphoma, leukemia, multiple myeloma, neuro-oncology, cutaneous malignancy, gastrointestinal, geriatric, head and neck, thoracic, urologic, breast, and gynecologic. As of 2023, Andre Goy is chair and Chief Physician Officer.

== Georgetown Lombardi Comprehensive Cancer Center affiliation ==
In 2019, JTCC received approval from the National Cancer Institute (NCI) as a member of the NCI-approved Georgetown Lombardi Comprehensive Cancer Center. The partnership focuses on advancing research and treatment in breast cancer, cancer prevention and control, experimental therapeutics and molecular oncology. The Georgetown Lombardi Comprehensive Cancer Center is designated by the National Cancer Institute as a leader in cancer treatment.

== Hackensack University Medical Center and Hackensack Meridian Health affiliations ==
JTCC is part of Hackensack University Medical Center. HUMC is part of the Hackensack Meridian Health network, which includes Joseph M. Sanzari Children's Hospital, the Cancer Center, a branch of The Betty Torricelli Institute for Breast Care, Ocean Medical Center, Pascack Valley Medical Center, and the Riverview Medical Center.

In 2022, JTCC expanded its program to Hackensack Meridian Jersey Shore University Medical Center's HOPE Tower, providing access to specialised cancer services and clinical trials.

=== Other affiliations ===
JTCC has a partnership with Memorial Sloan Kettering Cancer Center (MSK), with a governing board composed of members from both MSK and HMH.

In 2021, JTCC entered into a clinical affiliation with Regional Cancer Care Associates (RCCA) to open a practice called Toms River Regional Cancer Center in Toms River, NJ. The centre provides comprehensive medical and surgical oncology/hematology consultative services by community-based, regional, and national specialists for various types and stages of cancer and serious blood disorders.

In 2022, JTCC entered into a clinical affiliation with St. Joseph's Health to provide expanded cancer care services to the residents of Wayne, Paterson, and Totowa.

== Green initiatives ==
In 2011, JTCC at HUMC opened a $130-million, 155,000 sq ft (14,400 m^{2}) facility. The JTCC pavilion was built with a green roof for environmentalist purposes.

== Notable accomplishments ==
- JTCC initiated the first CAR T-cell therapy clinical trials through its NCI collaboration and became the first certified center in New Jersey to offer this treatment, in which a patient's own immune cells (T-cells) are trained to fight cancer.
- JTCC supports the Northeast's largest bone marrow transplant (BMT) program and, in 2014, performed 400 transplants.
- Treated first US patient with an investigatory drug for relapsed glioblastoma and other anaplastic gliomas.
- First to use a biomarker surveillance program that screens patients who are at high-risk for developing pancreatic cancer.
- Among the first of limited U.S. sites approved to offer Yescarta (axicabtagene ciloleucel), a cell-based gene therapy, to treat adult patients with certain types of large B-cell lymphoma who have not responded or relapsed after at least two other kinds of treatment. As of 2023, it is also approved for all six commercially available CAR-T products for lymphoma, multiple myeloma and pediatric B-Cell precursor acute lymphoblastic leukemia: Yescarta, Tecartus (brexucabtagene autoleucel), Breyanzi (lisocabtagene maraleucel), Carvykti (ciltacabtagene autoleucel), Abecma (idecabtagene vicleucel), and Kymriah (tisagenlecleucel).
