= CAR-NK =

Natural killer T cells genetically engineered to combat cancer

CAR-NK cells
- Other names: Chimeric antigen receptor natural killer cells
- Uses: Cancer immunotherapy, hematologic malignancies, solid tumors

CAR-NK cells (chimeric antigen receptor natural killer cells) are an emerging form of cellular immunotherapy for cancer. Researchers engineer natural killer (NK) cells, innate immune effectors, to express chimeric antigen receptors (CARs) that target specific tumor-associated antigens. Unlike CAR-T cells, CAR-NK cells offer advantages such as reduced risk of cytokine release syndrome (CRS) and graft-versus-host disease (GVHD), enabling "off-the-shelf" allogeneic use. As of 2025, CAR-NK therapies show promise in hematologic malignancies and solid tumors, with ongoing trials exploring their potential in autoimmune diseases.

== Natural killer cells ==
Natural killer (NK) cells form part of the innate immune system, recognizing and lysing abnormal cells without prior sensitization. They express activating and inhibitory receptors, balancing cytotoxicity against healthy cells. In cancer, NK cells target tumor cells via stress ligands, but tumors evade detection through MHC class I downregulation and immunosuppressive microenvironments. CAR technology, adapted from T-cell therapies, equips NK cells with synthetic receptors for antigen-specific targeting. CAR-NK cells retain NK-specific killing mechanisms, including antibody-dependent cellular cytotoxicity (ADCC) and cytokine release, complementing CAR-mediated lysis. This dual action enhances efficacy against heterogeneous tumors.

== History ==
CAR-NK therapy evolved from CAR-T successes in hematologic cancers. Early challenges included NK cell expansion and transduction efficiency. Researchers optimized CAR constructs for NK cells, incorporating NKG2D or CD16 proteins for enhanced activation. CAR generations adapted for NK cells include second-generation constructs with 4-1BB or 2B4 costimulatory domains for persistence. Third-generation CARs add IL-15 for autocrine signaling, enhancing expansion. Safety switches such as inducible caspase 9 enable controlled elimination.

Fourth-generation CAR-NK cells target IL-12 for solid tumors. iPSC platforms promise universal donors. Combination with PD-1 inhibitors enhances efficacy by 25% in preclinical models. By 2030, CAR-NK may treat 20% of refractory cancers.

As of 2025, 124 clinical trials were investigating CAR-NK cells, targeting 36 diseases, targeting both hematologic (54%) and solid (34%) tumors.

== Mechanism of action ==
CAR-NK cells express a synthetic receptor comprising an extracellular antigen-binding domain (scFv), transmembrane hinge, and intracellular signaling domain (CD3ζ, costimulatory molecules). Upon antigen binding, the CAR triggers NK activation, releasing perforin and granzymes for lysis, and cytokines like IFN-γ for tumor microenvironment modulation. Unlike CAR-T cells, CAR-NK retain ADCC via CD16 and NKG2D-mediated killing, providing multi-pathway antitumor effects. They also inhibit tumor growth via FasL and TRAIL. In solid tumors, CAR-NK cells overcome immunosuppressive environments by secreting IL-15, promoting persistence and recruiting other effectors. Preclinical models show CAR-NK efficacy against CD19+ lymphomas and HER2+ breast cancer.

== Sources ==
Natural killer cells derive from various sources, each with unique advantages. Sources include peripheral blood, cord blood, induced pluripotent stem cells (iPSCs), and NK-92 lines.

=== Peripheral blood ===
Peripheral blood mononuclear cells (PBMCs) yield autologous or allogeneic natural killer cells, offering rapid isolation but limited expansion. They express high CD16 for ADCC.

=== Cord blood ===
Umbilical cord blood provides naive NK cells with high proliferative potential and low alloreactivity. A phase 1 trial used cord blood cells against CD19+ B-cell malignancies, achieving complete remission in 73% of patients without CRS or neurotoxicity.

=== Induced pluripotent stem cells ===
iPSC-derived CAR-NK cells enable scalable, standardized production. iPSCs enable unlimited supply of standardized CAR-NK cells, free from donor variability. They differentiate into NK-like cells expressing high-affinity receptors. Preclinical studies demonstrate efficacy against leukemia without toxicity.

=== NK cell lines ===
The NK-92 line, irradiated for safety, transduces efficiently but requires repeated dosing due to lack of persistence. Clinical trials targeted solid tumors like ovarian cancer.

== Clinical trials ==
As of October 2025, 124 CAR-NK trials targeted 36 diseases, both hematologic malignancies (54%) and solid tumors (34%). Initial trials report high response rates and low toxicity.

=== Hematologic malignancies ===
A phase 1/2 trial of cord blood CAR-NK cells targeting CD19 in non-Hodgkin lymphoma and CLL achieved 73% overall response rate, with 64% complete remission and no severe CRS. Median remission lasted 9 months. NK-92-derived CAR-NK cells against BCMA in multiple myeloma showed 50% response in phase 1.

=== Solid tumors ===
Trials target HER2 in breast cancer and GD2 in neuroblastoma, with preclinical efficacy but limited persistence. A phase 1 trial of iPSC-derived CAR-NK cells against GD2 in neuroblastoma reported 40% stable disease. For ovarian cancer, NK-92 CAR-NK cells against MUC16 showed tumor reduction in xenografts. In 2025, a phase 1 trial of CAR-NK cells targeting CLDN18.2 in gastric cancer achieved 60% objective response rate.

=== Autoimmune diseases ===
Early trials explore CAR-NK cells for lupus and rheumatoid arthritis, targeting autoreactive B cells without broad immunosuppression.

== Comparison with CAR-T cells ==
CAR-NK cells avoid CRS and neurotoxicity, with incidence below 5% versus 80% in CAR-T trials. Allogeneic CAR-NK cells lack HLA matching requirements, reducing GVHD risk to zero. They bridge innate and adaptive immunity, killing via multiple pathways. Persistence averages 1–3 months, sufficient for hematologic responses but requiring optimization for solids.

== Challenges ==
NK cells expand less efficiently than T cells, limiting doses to 10^9 cells. Tumor microenvironments suppress CAR-NK via TGF-β, reducing infiltration. Antigen escape occurs in 20–30% of cases. In 2025, trials reported 15% manufacturing failure due to transduction variability. Strategies include armored CARs secreting IL-15 and checkpoint inhibitors.

== See also ==
- Natural killer cell
- Cancer immunotherapy
