= Nirali N. Shah =

American physician-scientist and pediatric hematologist-oncologist

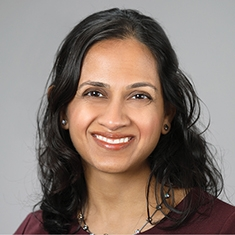
- Shah, 2019
- Education: University of Illinois at Chicago; Duke University School of Medicine
- Scientific career
- Fields: Pediatric hematology-oncology, clinical research
- Workplaces: National Cancer Institute

Nirali N. Shah is an American physician-scientist and pediatric hematologist-oncologist, serving as head of the hematologic malignancies section of the pediatric oncology branch at the National Cancer Institute. She researches the translation of immunotherapeutic approaches to treat high-risk hematologic malignancies in children, adolescents and young adults.

== Early life and education ==
Shah was raised in Chicago where her father is an internal medicine physician. She was interested in medicine at a young age. When Shah was 10, she fundraised for St. Jude Children's Research Hospital and heard about pediatric oncology. As an undergraduate, she shadowed a pediatric hematologist-oncologist and developed an interest in understanding the complexity of how haematopoiesis is disrupted by leukemia. Shah completed a B.S. in secondary education in chemistry at University of Illinois at Chicago in 2000.

Shah received her M.D. in 2004 from the University of Illinois College of Medicine. Shah subsequently completed a dual residency program in internal medicine and pediatrics at the Harvard Combined Residency program and trained jointly at the Boston Children's Hospital and Massachusetts General Hospital, during which time she also served as Chief Resident. She then joined the Pediatric Hematology and Oncology Fellowship joint training program between the National Cancer Institute (NCI), Pediatric Oncology Branch (POB) and Johns Hopkins University and was an Associate Research Physician in the Pediatric Oncology Branch. In 2012, Shah earned a Masters of Health Science in Clinical Research through the joint NIH-Duke University School of Medicine. She completed the American Society for Blood and Marrow Transplantation Clinical Research Training Course (2012).

== Career ==
In 2019, Shah was appointed as an NIH Lasker Investigator. She is a member of multiple societies, including the American Society of Hematology, the American Society for Transplantation and Cellular Therapy, the Children's Oncology Group, the Therapeutic Advances in Childhood Leukemia & Lymphoma consortium and the Pediatric Blood and Marrow Transplant Consortium. Shah is board certified in General Internal Medicine, General Pediatrics and Pediatric Hematology Oncology.

=== Research ===
Shah is a physician-scientist who serves as the head of the hematologic malignancies section of the Pediatric Oncology Branch. Her primary research interests focus on translation of immunotherapeutic approaches to treat high-risk hematologic malignancies in children, adolescents and young adults. She has a particular interest in prevention and treatment of relapsed disease after allogeneic hematopoietic stem cell transplantation. Her clinical trials focus on exploring and optimizing chimeric antigen receptor T cell (CAR-T cell) based strategies and other antibody based therapies to target surface proteins found on leukemia cells to improve outcomes for chemotherapy refractory disease. Additional areas of expertise include pediatric hematopoietic stem cell transplantation in both malignant and non-malignant diseases, development of early phase clinical trials in pediatric oncology, and ethical considerations for inclusion of minors in research. Shah also serves as the NCI Fellowship Program director for the joint Johns Hopkins Hospital-National Cancer Institute Pediatric Hematology-Oncology Fellowship Program.

Her clinical work has included implementation of conduct of several Phase I trials for the treatment of relapsed/refractory pediatric acute lymphoblastic leukemia. Prior trials have included a pediatric phase I trial of vincristine sulfate liposomal injections (Marqibo®), a pediatric phase I trial of moxetumomab pasudotox, (an anti-CD22 targeted immunotoxin based therapy), and a pilot trial using WT1 dendritic cell vaccines for the treatment of post-transplant relapsed leukemia. Results from the trials have included establishment of a safety profile, identification of a dose and an understanding of pharmacokinetics leading to development of Phase 2 multicenter studies that she will be leading. More recently she has led the effort in CAR-T cell therapy targeting CD22 for the treatment of relapsed/refractory ALL and will be leading a trial using a combinatorial CD19/CD22 targeted CAR-T cell approach. In addition to her work in leukemia, she also serves to support pediatric transplantation at the NCI by serving as an associate investigator on several transplant trials focused on patients with primary immunodeficiency and is leading the effort on transplantation for children with DOCK8 deficiency in collaboration with investigators in NIAID.

More recently she is leading an effort called Project EVOLVE (Evaluation of Lineage Switch: An International Initiative). This group is investigating postimmunotherapy lineage switching in relapse in leukemia patients. This project is collecting data from patients who have experienced LS and physicians who have diagnosed or treated it.

== Personal life ==
Shah speaks English and Gujarati.

== Selected works ==
- Haso, Waleed; Lee, Daniel W.; Shah, Nirali N.; Stetler-Stevenson, Maryalice; Yuan, Constance M.; Pastan, Ira H.; Dimitrov, Dimiter S.; Morgan, Richard A.; FitzGerald, David J.; Barrett, David M.; Wayne, Alan S. (February 2013). "Anti-CD22–chimeric antigen receptors targeting B-cell precursor acute lymphoblastic leukemia". Blood. 121 (7): 1165–1174. doi:10.1182/blood-2012-06-438002. ISSN 0006-4971. PMC 3575759. PMID 23243285.
- Shah, Nirali N.; Baird, Kristin; Delbrook, Cynthia P.; Fleisher, Thomas A.; Kohler, Mark E.; Rampertaap, Shakuntala; Lemberg, Kimberly; Hurley, Carolyn K.; Kleiner, David E.; Merchant, Melinda S.; Pittaluga, Stefania (January 2015). "Acute GVHD in patients receiving IL-15/4-1BBL activated NK cells following T-cell–depleted stem cell transplantation". Blood. 125 (5): 784–792. doi:10.1182/blood-2014-07-592881. ISSN 0006-4971. PMC 4311226. PMID 25452614.
- Lee, Daniel W; Kochenderfer, James N; Stetler-Stevenson, Maryalice; Cui, Yongzhi K; Delbrook, Cindy; Feldman, Steven A; Fry, Terry J; Orentas, Rimas; Sabatino, Marianna; Shah, Nirali N; Steinberg, Seth M (February 2015). "T cells expressing CD19 chimeric antigen receptors for acute lymphoblastic leukaemia in children and young adults: a phase 1 dose-escalation trial". The Lancet. 385 (9967): 517–528. doi:10.1016/S0140-6736(14)61403-3. PMC 7065359. PMID 25319501.
- Fry, Terry J.; Shah, Nirali N.; Orentas, Rimas J.; Stetler-Stevenson, Maryalice; Yuan, Constance M.; Ramakrishna, Sneha; Wolters, Pamela; Martin, Staci; Delbrook, Cindy; Yates, Bonnie; Shalabi, Haneen (January 2018). "CD22-targeted CAR T cells induce remission in B-ALL that is naive or resistant to CD19-targeted CAR immunotherapy". Nature Medicine. 24 (1): 20–28. doi:10.1038/nm.4441. ISSN 1546-170X. PMC 5774642. PMID 29155426.
- Shah, Nirali N.; Fry, Terry J. (June 2019). "Mechanisms of resistance to CAR T cell therapy". Nature Reviews Clinical Oncology. 16 (6): 372–385. doi:10.1038/s41571-019-0184-6. ISSN 1759-4782. PMC 8214555. PMID 30837712. S2CID 71145129.
- Pierce, Susan K.; Schwartzberg, Pamela L.; Shah, Nirali N.; Taylor, Naomi (March 2020). "Women in immunology: 2020 and beyond". Nature Immunology. 21 (3): 254–258. doi:10.1038/s41590-020-0618-4. ISSN 1529-2916. PMC 11549733. PMID 32094649. S2CID 211265214.
