= CART4-34 therapy =

CART4-34 therapy is an experimental chimeric antigen receptor T cell therapy that targets the IGHV4-34 B cell receptor. It attempts to treat certain B-cell lymphomas and autoimmune diseases such as systemic lupus erythematosus (SLE). It uses a patient's T cells modified to express a chimeric antigen receptor based on the 9G4 antibody. This receptor binds to IGHV4-34 on malignant or pathogenic B cells. Unlike CD19-targeted CAR T therapies, which eliminate many healthy B cells and suppress the immune system, CART4-34 spares most normal B cells because IGHV4-34 appears in only about 5% of them. Studies in cell lines and mouse models reported similar cancer-killing effects to CD19 CAR T, but with reduced risk of off-target damage. As of 2026, CART4-34 remains in preclinical stages, with plans for phase I trials in lymphoma and SLE.

== Mechanism of action ==
CART4-34 works by reprogramming a patient's T cells to attack B cells that express the IGHV4-34 B cell receptor. The technique inserts a gene into the T cells. That gene codes for a chimeric antigen receptor. The receptor includes a single-chain variable fragment from the 9G4 rat monoclonal antibody, which recognizes a specific sequence in framework region 1 of IGHV4-34. It has a costimulatory domain (such as 4-1BB) and a signaling domain (CD3ζ) to activate the T cell upon binding. Patients undergo leukapheresis to collect T cells. Labs then modify and expand those cells. Doctors infuse the cells into the patient after lymphodepleting chemotherapy.

The target, IGHV4-34, is an immunoglobulin heavy chain variable gene segment. B cells use it to form part of their surface receptor. In healthy people, it accounts for around 5% of the naive B cell repertoire. Peripheral tolerance mechanisms limit its activity because IGHV4-34 often binds self-antigens, such as N-acetyl-lactosamine on red blood cells or CD45 on B cells. This self-reactivity leads to anergy or exclusion from germinal centers in normal immune responses.

In B cell malignancies, IGHV4-34 enriches in certain subtypes. For example, it appears in 30% of activated B cell diffuse large B cell lymphoma cases. It also appears in 35% of primary central nervous system lymphomas, 65% of vitreoretinal lymphomas, and 35% of hairy cell leukemia variants.

Malignant B cells depend on B cell receptor signaling for survival. IGHV4-34 contributes to that signaling by binding self-glycoproteins like CD45, promoting proliferation. Inhibitors like ibrutinib disrupt that pathway in IGHV4-34-positive cells.

Upon infusion, CART4-34 T cells bind IGHV4-34-positive B cells. Binding triggers T cell activation, cytokine release, and cytotoxicity. The T cells proliferate and eliminate target cells through perforin and granzyme release. Optimization involves shortening the hinge domain from CD8 (44 amino acids) to IgG4 (12 amino acids) or G4S linker (5 amino acids). Shorter hinges improve immune synapse formation because the IGHV4-34 epitope sits 18 nm from the cell membrane, farther than CD19's 5 nm. That adjustment enhances killing efficiency.

Compared to CD19 CAR T, CART4-34 reduces antigen-negative escape. CD19 loss occurs in relapses after CD19 therapy. IGHV4-34 remains essential for malignant cell survival, so cells retain it even after CART4-34 exposure. It preserves the normal B cell repertoire, avoiding prolonged hypogammaglobulinemia. In autoimmune applications, IGHV4-34 antibodies enrich in SLE, binding nuclear antigens, DNA, and apoptotic cells. High levels correlate with disease severity. CART4-34 depletes those pathogenic B cells without affecting total IgG titers.

== History ==
University of Pennsylvania researchers first presented CART4-34 in 2023. They described its design and initial testing in cell lines and mouse models. Their study appeared in February 2026. That paper detailed optimization and applications in lymphoma and SLE. Separate funding supported preclinical work for SLE, aiming for a phase I trial.

== Research ==
Preclinical studies tested CART4-34 in vitro and in vivo. In cytotoxicity assays, it killed IGHV4-34-positive malignant B cells from lines such as HBL1, Jeko1-IGHV4-34, Bonna12, and Mec1-IGHV4-34. It spared IGHV4-34-negative cells and healthy B cells. Cytokine secretion (interferon-gamma, tumor necrosis factor-alpha) and proliferation occurred only against positive targets.

Initial versions with a CD8 hinge showed strong short-term killing but poor long-term and in vivo performance. Optimized versions with short hinges (IgG4 or G4S) improved results in extended assays. In HBL1 xenograft mice, optimized CART4-34 controlled tumors as well as or better than CD19 CAR T. It expanded robustly without depleting normal B cells.

In SLE models, CART4-34 targeted IGHV4-34-positive B cells from patient samples ex vivo. It depleted autoantibodies without harming overall B cell populations or IgG levels.

No human trials had results by 2026. Planned phase I studies aim to assess safety and dosing in relapsed/refractory IGHV4-34-positive lymphomas.

== Safety profile ==
Preclinical data suggest low toxicity. It avoids broad B cell depletion, reducing infection risk. Cytokine release syndrome and neurotoxicity, common in CAR T, may occur but at lower levels due to superior specificity. Mouse models showed no off-target effects on IGHV4-34-negative cells.

== Potential applications ==
CART4-34 suits IGHV4-34-enriched lymphomas, such as activated B cell diffuse large B cell lymphoma. It may treat other malignancies with IGHV4-34, including chronic lymphocytic leukemia subsets. In SLE, it targets pathogenic B cells, potentially resetting immunity without broad suppression.

== See also ==
- Chimeric antigen receptor T cell
- B-cell lymphoma
- Systemic lupus erythematosus
