= Gideon Gross =

Israeli immunologist

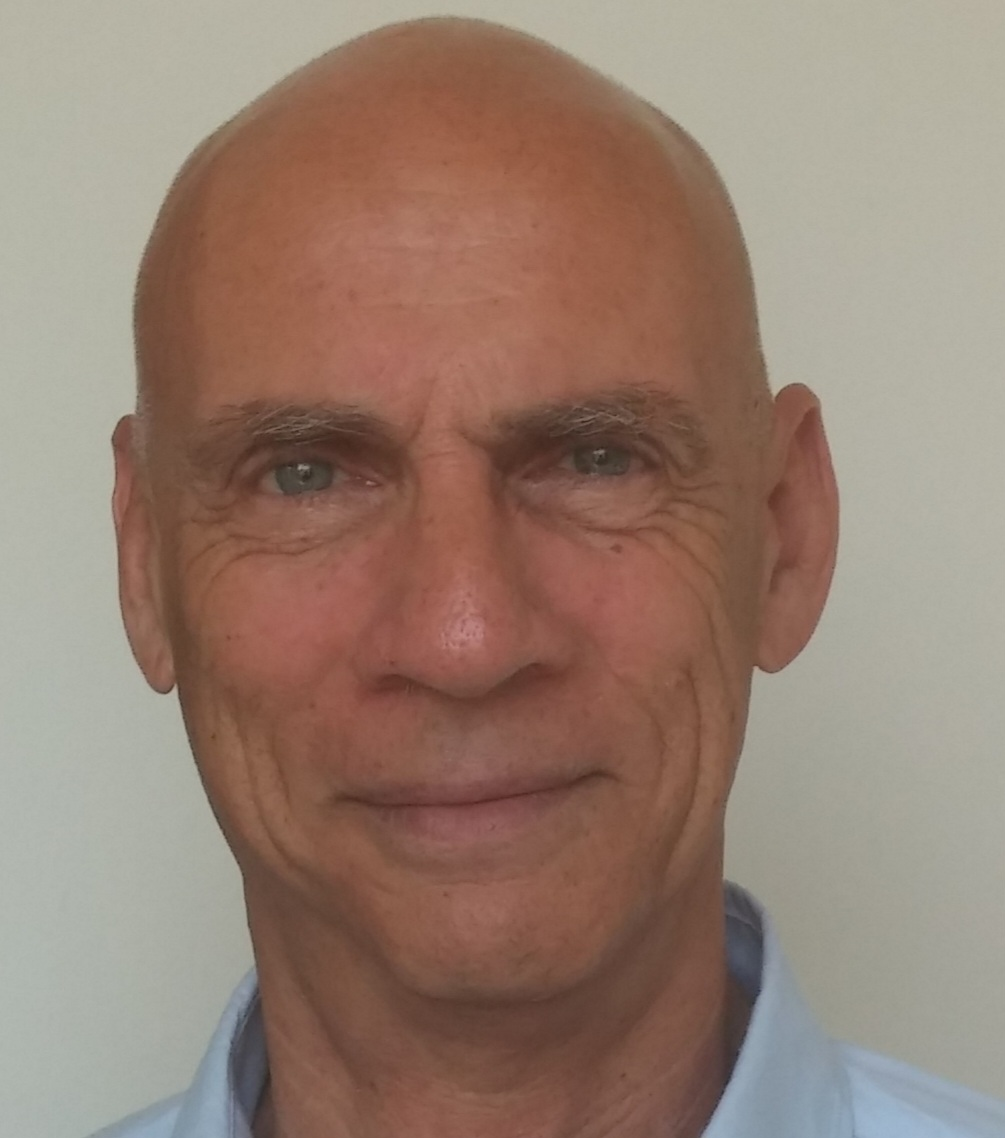

Gideon Gross (Hebrew: גדעון גרוס) is an Israeli immunologist, inventor and farmer. Together with Zelig Eshhar at the Weizmann Institute of Science, they created the first chimeric antigen receptors (CARs). He was dean of the Faculty of Sciences & Technology of Tel-Hai Academic College from 2010 to 2014.
