= Lenzilumab =

Chemical compound

Monoclonal antibody
- Type: Whole antibody
- Source: Human
- Target: human colony stimulating factor 2

Clinical data
- Other names: KB003
- ATC code: none

Identifiers
- CAS Number: 1229575-09-0
- ChemSpider: none
- UNII: IE4X6497XK
- KEGG: D11236

Chemical and physical data
- Formula: C_{6474}H_{10024}N_{1748}O_{2010}S_{42}
- Molar mass: 145852.15 g·mol^{−1}

Lenzilumab (INN; development code KB003) is a humanized monoclonal antibody (class IgG1 kappa) that targets colony stimulating factor 2 (CSF2)/granulocyte-macrophage colony stimulating factor (GM-CSF).

Pre-clinical evidence and clinical data implicate GM-CSF as a crucial initiator in the systemic inflammatory pathway driving the serious and life-threatening chimeric antigen receptor T cell (CAR-T) associated cytokine release syndrome (CRS). GM-CSF is produced by CAR-T cells upon recognition of target cells, which activates myeloid cells and compels them to produce monocyte chemoattractant protein 1 (MCP-1) and its receptor (CCR2). GM-CSF knockout CAR-T cells protect mice from CRS; however, IL-6 knockout mice receiving wild-type CAR-T cells were not protected from CRS. Moreover, mice infused with GM-CSF knockout CAR-T cells have significantly lower serum levels of MCP-1, IL-6, MIG, and MIP-1 than mice receiving wild-type CAR-T cells, demonstrating the role of GM-CSF signaling early in the inflammatory cascade. Administration of Lenzilumab in a patient-derived xenograft model significantly reduced CRS and neurotoxicity in mice, while preserving anti-leukemic efficacy. A multi-center phase I/II trial including the MD Anderson Cancer Center will evaluate lenzilumab as prophylaxis for CRS and neurotoxicity in collaboration with Kite and is currently in recruitment.

Additionally, GM-CSF has been shown to be instrumental in donor T-cell licensing of host and donor-derived myeloid cells in graft versus host disease (GVHD) following hematopoietic allotransplantation. Mice receiving allografts deficient in GM-CSF have significantly reduced incidence and severity of GVHD. A Phase II study with the University of Zürich and the United Kingdom's Stem Cell Transplantation IMPACT group will be investigating the efficacy of lenzilumab in prevention of acute GVHD and is currently in active planning.

In light of the recent coronavirus disease 2019 (COVID-19) pandemic, the role of GM-CSF in the cytokine-mediated immunopathology of lung injury and acute respiratory distress syndrome (ARDS) has been under investigation. Plasma of hospitalized patients with confirmed COVID-19 has elevated levels of several inflammatory cytokines including IL-1B, IL-2, GM-CSF, IFN-γ, IP-10, MCP-1, MIP-1A/B, TNFα, and VEGF, indicative of a cytokine storm. Importantly, significantly higher levels of MCP-1, MIP-1A, and IP-10 (all of which are downstream of GM-CSF) were found to be significantly higher in ICU-admitted patients versus hospitalized but non-ICU admitted patients. A Phase III protocol for evaluating the efficacy of lenzilumab in the prevention and treatment of ARDS has been submitted to the FDA.

Lenzilumab is under development by Humanigen Inc. and was originally designed for the treatment of chronic myelomonocytic leukemia (CMML) and juvenile myelomonocytic leukemia (JMML). In vitro studies on human cells have demonstrated that Lenzilumab can induce sensitivity in myeloid and monocytic cells suggesting the antibody's applicability in CMML and JMML indications. As of 2017, lenzilumab is currently undergoing clinical trials for CMML. Prior to application in treating CMML, lenzilumab was assessed for use in treating inadequately controlled asthma and rheumatoid arthritis.

== Covid-19 ==
The NIH has chosen lenzilumab for its ACTIV-5 Big Effect trial.

== See also ==
- Rituximab
- Tipifarnib
