= Brexucabtagene autoleucel =

Cell based gene therapy

Clinical data
- Trade names: Tecartus
- Other names: KTE-X19, brexu-cel
- AHFS/Drugs.com: Tecartus
- License data: US DailyMed: Brexucabtagene autoleucel
- Pregnancy category: AU: C; Not recommended
- Routes of administration: Intravenous
- ATC code: L01XL06 (WHO)

Legal status
- Legal status: AU: C4 (class 4 biological); CA: ℞-only / Schedule D; US: ℞-only; EU: Rx-only

Identifiers
- DrugBank: DB15699
- UNII: 4MD2J2T8SJ
- KEGG: D11880

Brexucabtagene autoleucel, sold under the brand name Tecartus, is a cell-based gene therapy medication for the treatment of mantle cell lymphoma (MCL) and acute lymphoblastic leukemia (ALL).

The most common side effects include serious infections, low blood cell counts and a weakened immune system. The most common side effects for the treatment of ALL include fever, CRS, hypotension, encephalopathy, tachycardias, nausea, chills, headache, fatigue, febrile neutropenia, diarrhea, musculoskeletal pain, hypoxia, rash, edema, tremor, infection with pathogen unspecified, constipation, decreased appetite, and vomiting.

Brexucabtagene autoleucel is a chimeric antigen receptor T cell therapy and is the first cell-based gene therapy approved by the U.S. Food and Drug Administration (FDA) for the treatment of mantle cell lymphoma.

Brexucabtagene autoleucel was approved for medical use in the United States in July 2020, and in the European Union in December 2020.

== Medical uses ==
Brexucabtagene autoleucel is indicated for the treatment of adults with relapsed or refractory mantle cell lymphoma. It is also indicated for the treatment of adults with relapsed or refractory B-cell precursor acute lymphoblastic leukemia.

Mantle cell lymphoma (MCL) is a rare form of cancerous B-cell non-Hodgkin's lymphoma that usually occurs in middle-aged or older adults. In people with MCL, B-cells, a type of white blood cell which help the body fight infection, change into cancer cells that start to form tumors in the lymph nodes and quickly spread to other areas of the body.

Each dose of brexucabtagene autoleucel is a customized treatment created using the recipient's own immune system to help fight the lymphoma. The recipient's T cells, a type of white blood cell, are collected and genetically modified to include a new gene that facilitates the targeting and killing of the lymphoma cells. These modified T cells are then infused back into the recipient.

== Adverse effects ==
The FDA label carries a boxed warning for cytokine release syndrome (CRS), which is a systemic response to the activation and proliferation of CAR-T cells causing high fever and flu-like symptoms, and for neurologic toxicities. Both cytokine release syndrome and neurologic toxicities can be fatal or life-threatening.

In April 2024, the FDA label boxed warning was expanded to include T cell malignancies.

The most common side effects of brexucabtagene autoleucel include serious infections, low blood cell counts and a weakened immune system. Side effects from treatment usually appear within the first one to two weeks after treatment, but some side effects may occur later. The most common Grade 3 or higher reactions were anemia, neutropenia, thrombocytopenia, hypotension, hypophosphatemia, encephalopathy, leukopenia, hypoxia, pyrexia, hyponatremia, hypertension, infection – pathogen unspecified, pneumonia, hypocalcemia, and lymphopenia.

Because of the risk of cytokine release syndrome and neurological toxicities, brexucabtagene autoleucel was approved with a risk evaluation and mitigation strategy (REMS), which includes elements to assure safe use. The risk mitigation measures for brexucabtagene autoleucel are identical to those of the REMS Program for another CAR-T therapy, axicabtagene ciloleucel (Yescarta).

== History ==
Brexucabtagene autoleucel was approved for medical use in patients with MCL in the United States in July 2020, and in Europe in December 2020. It was later approved for patients with ALL in the US in October 2021 and Europe in December 2021.

Approval was based on ZUMA-2 (NCT02601313), an open-label, multicenter, single-arm trial of 74 participants with relapsed or refractory MCL who had previously received anthracycline- or bendamustine-containing chemotherapy, an anti-CD20 antibody, and a Bruton tyrosine kinase inhibitor. Participants received a single infusion of brexucabtagene autoleucel following completion of lymphodepleting chemotherapy. The primary efficacy outcome measure was objective response rate (ORR) per Lugano [2014] criteria as assessed by an independent review committee. The complete remission rate after treatment with brexucabtagene autoleucel was 62 percent, with an objective response rate of 87 percent.

The application for brexucabtagene autoleucel was approved under the accelerated approval pathway and it was granted priority review, breakthrough therapy, and orphan drug designations.

Efficacy for adults with relapsed or refractory B-cell precursor acute lymphoblastic leukemia was evaluated in ZUMA-3 (NCT02614066), a single-arm multicenter trial that evaluated brexucabtagene autoleucel, a CD19-directed chimeric antigen receptor (CAR) T-cell therapy. Participants received a single infusion of brexucabtagene autoleucel following completion of lymphodepleting chemotherapy.

== Society and culture ==
=== Names ===
Brexucabtagene autoleucel is the international nonproprietary name.
