= Marco Ruella =

Italian-American physician-scientist

- Education: University of Torino (MD)
- Known for: CAR-T cell therapy, mechanisms of resistance in cellular immunotherapy
- Awards: American Society of Hematology Scholar Award; NIH K99/R00 Pathway to Independence Award; Leukemia & Lymphoma Society Translational Research Program Award; Alan Steinberg Award in Cancer Research; Elected to the American Society for Clinical Investigation
- Scientific career
- Fields: Hematology, Immunotherapy, Cancer research
- Workplaces: University of Pennsylvania; Hospital of the University of Pennsylvania; University of Turin

Marco Ruella is an Italian-American physician-scientist specializing in hematologic malignancies and cellular immunotherapy. He serves as Scientific Director of the Lymphoma Program at the Abramson Cancer Center and is a Principal Investigator in the Center for Cellular Immunotherapies, a research center led by Carl H. June.

Ruella is a tenured associate professor of medicine at the Perelman School of Medicine at the University of Pennsylvania and an attending physician at the Hospital of the University of Pennsylvania. His research focuses on chimeric antigen receptor T-cell (CAR-T) therapy, particularly mechanisms of resistance and strategies to improve cellular immunotherapies for leukemia and lymphoma.

His work has been cited more than 15,000 times and he has an h-index above 50 according to Google Scholar.

== Early life and education ==
Ruella received his Doctor of Medicine degree from the University of Torino in Italy in 2007, graduating with honors. He subsequently completed a specialization in hematology at the University of Torino, training under hematologist Corrado Tarella.

During this period he worked as an attending physician in the Hematology and Cell Therapy Division of Mauriziano Hospital in Turin and taught at the Biotechnology School of the University of Torino.

In 2012 he moved to the United States to join the University of Pennsylvania as a postdoctoral fellow in the Center for Cellular Immunotherapies, where he worked with Carl H. June, Michael Kalos, and Saar I. Gill.

== Academic career ==
Ruella became an instructor at the University of Pennsylvania in 2016 and was appointed assistant professor of medicine in the Division of Hematology and Oncology in 2018. In 2025 he was promoted to tenured associate professor of medicine.

He serves as Scientific Director of the Lymphoma Program at the Abramson Cancer Center, where he oversees translational research and clinical programs focused on lymphoma.

Since 2024 he has also held an academic appointment at the University of Turin in Italy.

== Research ==
=== Mechanisms of CAR-T resistance ===
In 2018, Ruella and colleagues described a rare mechanism of relapse after CAR-T therapy in which the CAR19 transgene was inadvertently inserted into a leukemic B cell during manufacturing, enabling the malignant cell to evade CAR-T targeting.

=== Apoptosis pathways and tumor resistance ===
Ruella's group identified defects in tumor apoptosis signaling pathways, particularly death-receptor pathways, as contributors to resistance to CAR-T therapy.

=== Development of next-generation CAR-T therapies ===
Ruella has also contributed to the development of CD22-targeting CARs and gene-edited CAR-T cells designed to enhance anti-tumor activity.

=== Host factors affecting CAR-T outcomes ===
In collaboration with researchers at Memorial Sloan Kettering Cancer Center, Ruella showed that gut microbiota composition may influence clinical outcomes after CAR-T therapy.

His group has also studied the interaction between tumor apoptosis pathways and targeted therapies, including combinations of CAR-T therapy with drugs such as the BCL-2 inhibitor venetoclax.

== Professional service ==
- Senior Editor, Molecular Cancer Therapeutics (American Association for Cancer Research)
- Associate Editor, Journal for Immunotherapy of Cancer (Society for Immunotherapy of Cancer)
- Inaugural Chair, Cellular Therapy Committee, Society for Immunotherapy of Cancer (SITC)
- Chair, Scientific Committee on Transplantation Biology and Cellular Therapy, American Society of Hematology (ASH)

He is also a standing member of the Therapeutic Immune Regulation study section at the U.S. National Institutes of Health.

== Honors and awards ==
- American Society of Hematology Scholar Award
- NIH K99/R00 Pathway to Independence Award
- Leukemia & Lymphoma Society Translational Research Program Award
- Alan Steinberg Award in Cancer Research
- Election to the American Society for Clinical Investigation
