= Allogeneic cultured keratinocytes and dermal fibroblasts in murine collagen =

Medication

Clinical data
- Trade names: Stratagraft
- License data: US DailyMed: Stratagraft
- Routes of administration: Topical
- ATC code: None

Legal status
- Legal status: US: ℞-only

Identifiers
- DrugBank: DB16709
- UNII: DYB2T93463

Allogeneic cultured keratinocytes and dermal fibroblasts in murine collagen, sold under the brand name Stratagraft, is a medical treatment used for thermal burns containing intact dermal elements.

Common side effects include pruritus (itching), blisters, hypertrophic scar, and impaired healing (stalled healing process) at the treatment site.

Stratagraft is produced from two kinds of human skin cells (keratinocytes and dermal fibroblasts) grown together to make a bi-layered construct (a cellularized scaffold). Since the human keratinocyte cells were grown with mouse cells during initial stages of product development, Stratagraft is formally considered to be a xenotransplantation product (involving tissues or cells belonging to different species). Mouse cells are no longer used in the final manufacturing process. It was approved for medical use in the United States in June 2021.

== Medical uses ==
Stratagraft (allogeneic cultured keratinocytes and dermal fibroblasts in murine collagen-dsat) is indicated for the treatment of adults with thermal burns containing intact dermal elements for which surgical intervention is clinically indicated (deep partial-thickness burns).

== History ==
The US Food and Drug Administration (FDA) evaluated the effectiveness and safety of Stratagraft based on two randomized clinical studies involving a total of 101 adult participants with deep partial thickness thermal burns. In both studies, two deep partial-thickness burn wounds of comparable area and depth on each participant were identified and randomized to receive either a single topical application of Stratagraft or autograft. The effectiveness is demonstrated by the percentage of Stratagraft treatment sites that achieved a complete wound closure, and the significantly decreased need for autografts at the Stratagraft treatment sites.

The FDA granted Stratagraft regenerative medicine advanced therapy, priority review, and orphan drug designations for this indication. Stratagraft was developed in conjunction with the U.S. Department of Health and Human Services’ Biomedical Advanced Research and Development Authority. The FDA granted approval to Stratatech, a Mallinckrodt company.
