= Leukocyte apheresis =

Medical device therapy

- Specialty: Gastrointestinal

Leukocyte apheresis is a medical device therapy (selective granulocyte/monocyte adsorptive {GMA} apheresis; GMDN code: 47306) for the treatment of inflammation of the colon. It works by removing from the blood a group of white blood cells called activated leukocytes that play a key role in the inflammatory stages of ulcerative colitis (UC). Selectively reducing these cells in the blood helps to reduce inflammation in the colon. Leukocyte apheresis can help UC patients with chronic, grumbling disease who are either unsuitable for, intolerant of, or failing on medicines described above.
