= Lisocabtagene maraleucel =

Gene therapy medication

Gene therapy
- Target gene: CD19

Clinical data
- Trade names: Breyanzi
- Other names: JCAR017, LM, liso-cel
- AHFS/Drugs.com: Monograph
- MedlinePlus: a621017
- License data: US DailyMed: Lisocabtagene maraleucel
- Routes of administration: Intravenous
- Drug class: Antineoplastic
- ATC code: L01XL08 (WHO)

Legal status
- Legal status: CA: ℞-only / Schedule D; US: ℞-only; EU: Rx-only

Identifiers
- DrugBank: DB16582
- UNII: 7K2YOJ14X0
- KEGG: D11990
- ChEMBL: ChEMBL4297236

Lisocabtagene maraleucel, sold under the brand name Breyanzi, is a cell-based gene therapy used to treat B-cell lymphomas, including follicular lymphoma.

Side effects include hypersensitivity reactions, serious infections, low blood cell counts, and a weakened immune system. The most common side effects include decreases in neutrophils (a type of white blood cell that fights infections), in red blood cells or in blood platelets (components that help the blood to clot), as well as cytokine release syndrome (a potentially life-threatening condition that can cause fever, vomiting, shortness of breath, pain and low blood pressure) and tiredness. The most common adverse reactions for treating follicular lymphoma include cytokine release syndrome, headache, musculoskeletal pain, fatigue, constipation, and fever.

Lisocabtagene maraleucel, a chimeric antigen receptor (CAR) T cell (CAR-T) therapy, is the third gene therapy approved by the US Food and Drug Administration (FDA) for certain types of non-Hodgkin lymphoma, including diffuse large B-cell lymphoma. Lisocabtagene maraleucel was approved for medical use in the United States in February 2021.

== Medical uses ==
In the US, lisocabtagene maraleucel is indicated for the treatment of adults with large B-cell lymphoma, including diffuse large B-cell lymphoma not otherwise specified (including diffuse large B-cell lymphoma arising from indolent lymphoma), high-grade B cell lymphoma, primary mediastinal large B-cell lymphoma, and follicular lymphoma grade 3B, who have refractory disease to first-line chemoimmunotherapy or relapse within 12 months of first-line chemoimmunotherapy; or disease to first-line chemoimmunotherapy or relapse after first-line chemoimmunotherapy and are not eligible for hematopoietic stem cell transplantation (HSCT) due to comorbidities or age; or relapsed or refractory disease after two or more lines of systemic therapy. It is also indicated for adults with relapsed or refractory chronic lymphocytic leukemia or small lymphocytic lymphoma who have received at least two prior lines of therapy, including a Bruton tyrosine kinase inhibitor and a B-cell lymphoma 2 inhibitor.

In the EU, lisocabtagene maraleucel is indicated for the treatment of adults with diffuse large B-cell lymphoma, high grade B-cell lymphoma, primary mediastinal large B-cell lymphoma and follicular lymphoma grade 3B, who relapsed within 12 months from completion of, or are refractory to, first-line chemoimmunotherapy.

Lisocabtagene maraleucel is not indicated for the treatment of people with primary central nervous system lymphoma.

In May 2024, the US Food and Drug Administration (FDA) expanded the indication for lisocabtagene maraleucel to include the treatment of adults with relapsed or refractory follicular lymphoma who have received two or more prior lines of systemic therapy; and the treatment of adults with relapsed or refractory mantle cell lymphoma who have received at least two prior lines of systemic therapy, including a Bruton tyrosine kinase inhibitor.

In December 2025, the FDA expanded the indication for lisocabtagene maraleucel to include the treatment of adults with relapsed or refractory marginal zone lymphoma who have received at least two prior lines of systemic therapy.

== Adverse effects ==
The US Food and Drug Administration (FDA) prescription label carries a boxed warning for cytokine release syndrome (CRS), which is a systemic response to the activation and proliferation of CAR-T cells, causing high fever and flu-like symptoms and neurologic toxicities.

In April 2024, the FDA prescription label boxed warning was expanded to include T cell malignancies.

== History ==
Lisocabtagene maraleucel's safety and efficacy were established in a multicenter clinical trial of more than 250 adults with refractory or relapsed large B-cell lymphoma. The complete remission rate after treatment was 54%.

The US Food and Drug Administration (FDA) granted lisocabtagene maraleucel priority review, orphan drug, regenerative medicine advanced therapy (RMAT), and breakthrough therapy designations. Lisocabtagene maraleucel is the first regenerative medicine therapy with RMAT designation to be licensed by the FDA. The FDA granted approval of Breyanzi to Juno Therapeutics Inc., a Bristol-Myers Squibb Company.

Efficacy was evaluated in TRANSFORM (NCT03575351), a randomized, open-label, multicenter trial in adults with primary refractory large B-cell lymphoma or relapse within twelve months of achieving complete response (CR) to first-line therapy. Participants had not yet received treatment for relapsed or refractory lymphoma and were potential candidates for autologous HSCT. A total of 184 participants were randomized 1:1 to receive a single infusion of lisocabtagene maraleucel following fludarabine and cyclophosphamide lymphodepleting chemotherapy or to receive second-line standard therapy, consisting of three cycles of chemoimmunotherapy followed by high-dose therapy and autologous HSCT in participants who attained CR or partial response (PR).

Efficacy was also evaluated in PILOT (NCT03483103), a single-arm, open-label, multicenter trial in transplant-ineligible patients with relapsed or refractory large B-cell lymphoma after one line of chemoimmunotherapy. The study enrolled participants who were ineligible for high-dose therapy and HSCT due to organ function or age, but who had adequate organ function for CAR-T cell therapy. Efficacy was based on CR rate and duration of response (DOR) as determined by an IRC. Of 74 participants who underwent leukapheresis (median age, 73 years), 61 (82%) received lisocabtagene maraleucel of whom 54% (95% CI: 41, 67) achieved CR. The median DOR was not reached (95% CI: 11.2 months, not reached) in participants who achieved CR and 2.1 months (95% CI: 1.4, 2.3) in participants with a best response of PR. Among all leukapheresed participants, the CR rate was 46% (95% CI: 34, 58).

For the treatment of follicular lymphoma, efficacy was evaluated in TRANSCEND-FL (NCT04245839), a phase II, open-label, multicenter, single-arm trial in adults with relapsed or refractory follicular lymphoma after two or more lines of systemic therapy (including an anti-CD20 antibody and an alkylating agent). Participants were eligible to enroll in the study if they had adequate bone marrow function to receive lymphodepleting chemotherapy and an ECOG performance status of 1 or less.

== Society and culture ==
=== Legal status ===
In January 2022, the Committee for Medicinal Products for Human Use of the European Medicines Agency adopted a positive opinion, recommending the granting of a marketing authorization for the medicinal product Breyanzi, intended for the treatment of adults with relapsed or refractory diffuse large B cell lymphoma, primary mediastinal large B-cell lymphoma and follicular lymphoma grade 3B, after at least two previous lines of treatments. The applicant for this medicinal product is Bristol-Myers Squibb Pharma EEIG. Lisocabtagene maraleucel was approved for medical use in the European Union in April 2022.

=== Names ===
Lisocabtagene maraleucel is the international nonproprietary name (INN).
