= Zelig Eshhar =

Israeli immunologist (1941–2025)

- זליג אשחר
- Born: Zelig Lipka; February 25, 1941; Petah Tikva, Mandatory Palestine
- Died: July 3, 2025 (aged 84); Tel Yitzhak, Israel
- Occupation: Immunologist
- Known for: Development of CAR T-cell therapy
- Awards: Israel Prize in Life Sciences (2015); Dan David Prize (2021); Canada Gairdner International Award (2024); Warren Alpert Foundation Prize (2024)

Zelig Eshhar (Hebrew: זליג אשחר; February 25, 1941 – July 3, 2025) was an Israeli immunologist at the Weizmann Institute of Science and the Tel Aviv Sourasky Medical Center. He was Chairman of the Department of Immunology at the Weizmann Institute twice, in the 1990s and 2000s.

== Background ==
Zelig Lipka (later Eshhar) was born in Petah Tikva on February 25, 1941, and grew up in Rehovot. After his IDF service in Nahal, he joined Kibbutz Yad Mordechai, where he became a beekeeper. He received his B.Sc. and M.Sc. from the Hebrew University of Jerusalem, and his Ph.D. from the Weizmann Institute.

Eshhar died in Tel Yitzhak, Israel on July 3, 2025, at the age of 84.

== Medical research ==
Eshhar is mainly known for his studies on T cells and his pioneering work on chimeric antigen receptors. His work has been the basis of the development of a cancer immunotherapy, involving genetic modifications of T lymphocytes extracted from a cancer patient to produce chimeric antigen receptor (CAR) T-Cells, which are then injected back into the patient in a process called adoptive cell transfer, that produced startlingly good results in clinical trials in the mid-2010s and millions of dollars of investment.

== Awards and recognition ==
In 2013 Eshhar was awarded the CAR Pioneering award by the ATTACK European Consortium as well as the European Society of Gene & Cell Therapy Outstanding Achievement Award. In 2014 he shared the Massry Prize with Steven Rosenberg and James P. Allison and the Pioneer Award with Carl H. June. He is the recipient of the 2015 Israel Prize in Life Sciences and the 2019 Cancer Research Institute's William B. Coley Award. In 2021 he was awarded the Dan David Prize. In 2024 he received the Canada Gairdner International Award. In December 2024, he also received the VinFuture Prize's Outstanding Achievements in Emerging Fields alongside Carl H. June and Michel Sadelain for their contributions to the development and advancement of CAR T cell therapy, a revolutionary "living drug" that is transforming the treatment of cancer and autoimmune diseases worldwide. In 2024 he was awarded the Warren Alpert Foundation Prize.

== See also ==
- Science and technology in Israel
- Healthcare in Israel
