= MLANA =

Protein-coding gene in humans

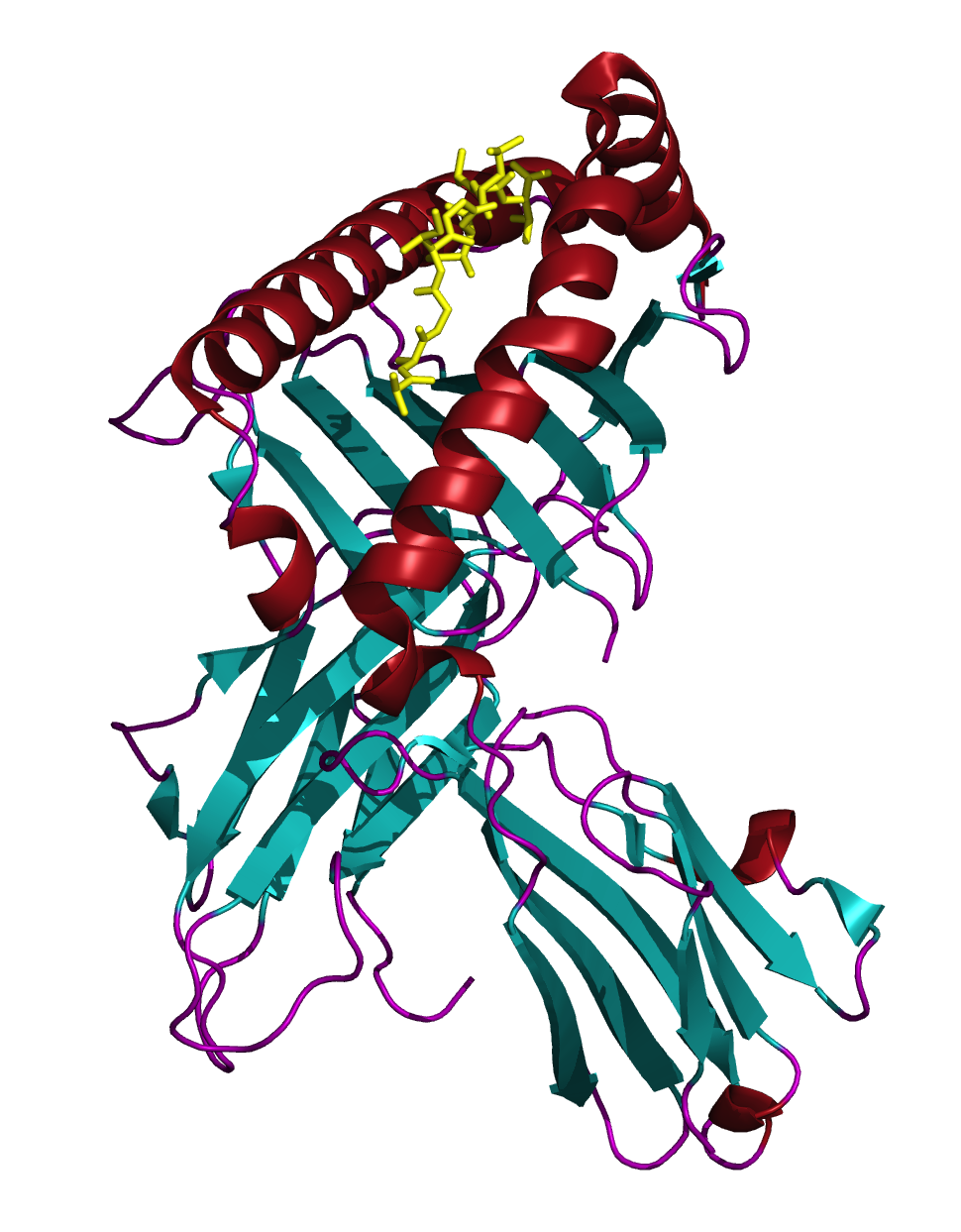
Available structures
PDB	Ortholog search: PDBe RCSB
PDB	List of PDB id codes 2GT9, 2GTW, 2GTZ, 2GUO, 3HG1, 3L6F, 3MRO, 3MRP, 3MRQ, 3QDM, 3QEQ, 3QFD, 4EUP, 4JFF, 4L3E, 4QOK, 4WJ5, 5E9D

Identifiers
- Aliases: MLANA, MART-1, MART1, melan-A
- External IDs: OMIM: 605513; MGI: 108454; HomoloGene: 4026; GeneCards: MLANA; OMA:MLANA - orthologs

Gene location (Human)
Chr.	Chromosome 9 (human)
Band	9p24.1	Start	5,890,889 bp
Band	9p24.1	End	5,910,606 bp

Gene location (Mouse)
Chr.	Chromosome 19 (mouse)
Band	19 C1|19 24.28 cM	Start	29,675,224 bp
Band	19 C1|19 24.28 cM	End	29,686,034 bp
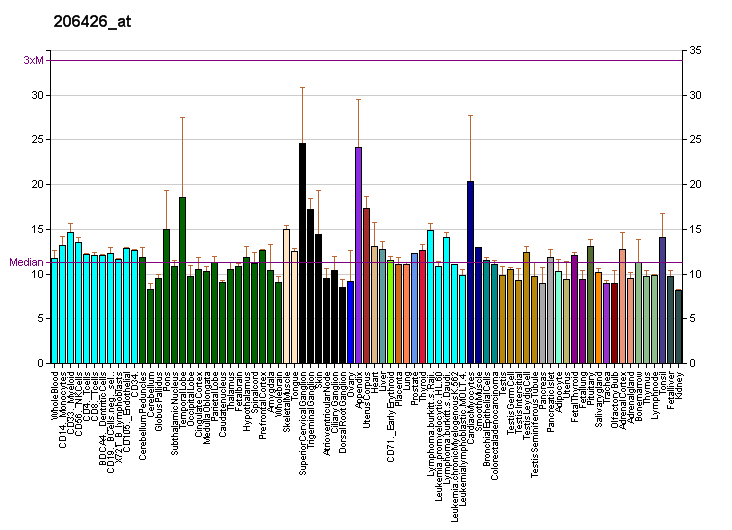

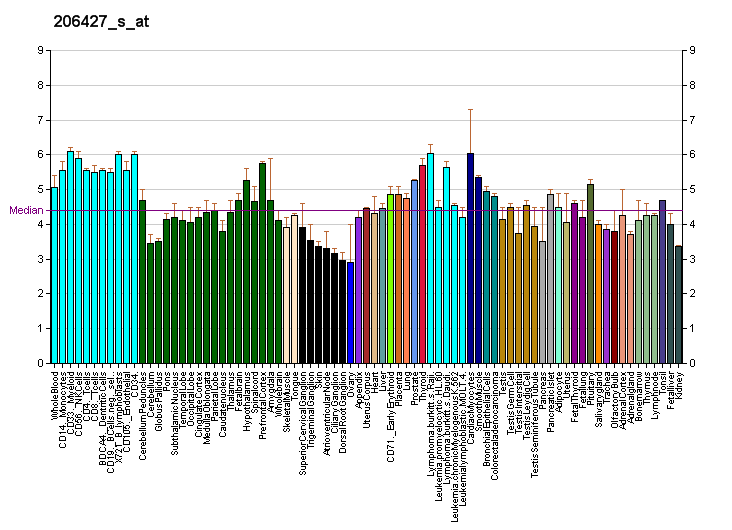
RNA expression pattern
Bgee	Human / Mouse (ortholog); Top expressed in: skin of thigh; retinal pigment epithelium; skin of abdomen; testicle; skin of arm; gonad; vulva; skin of hip; human penis; monocyte / Top expressed in: iris; ciliary body; hair follicle; stria vascularis; skin of abdomen; retinal pigment epithelium; embryo; epithelium of lens; embryo; skin of back; More reference expression data
BioGPS	More reference expression data
Orthologs
Species	Human	Mouse
Entrez	2315	77836
Ensembl	ENSG00000120215	ENSMUSG00000024806
UniProt	Q16655	Q2TA50
RefSeq (mRNA)	NM_005511	NM_029993
RefSeq (protein)	NP_005502	NP_084269
Location (UCSC)	Chr 9: 5.89 – 5.91 Mb	Chr 19: 29.68 – 29.69 Mb
PubMed search
- Wikidata
View/Edit Human	View/Edit Mouse

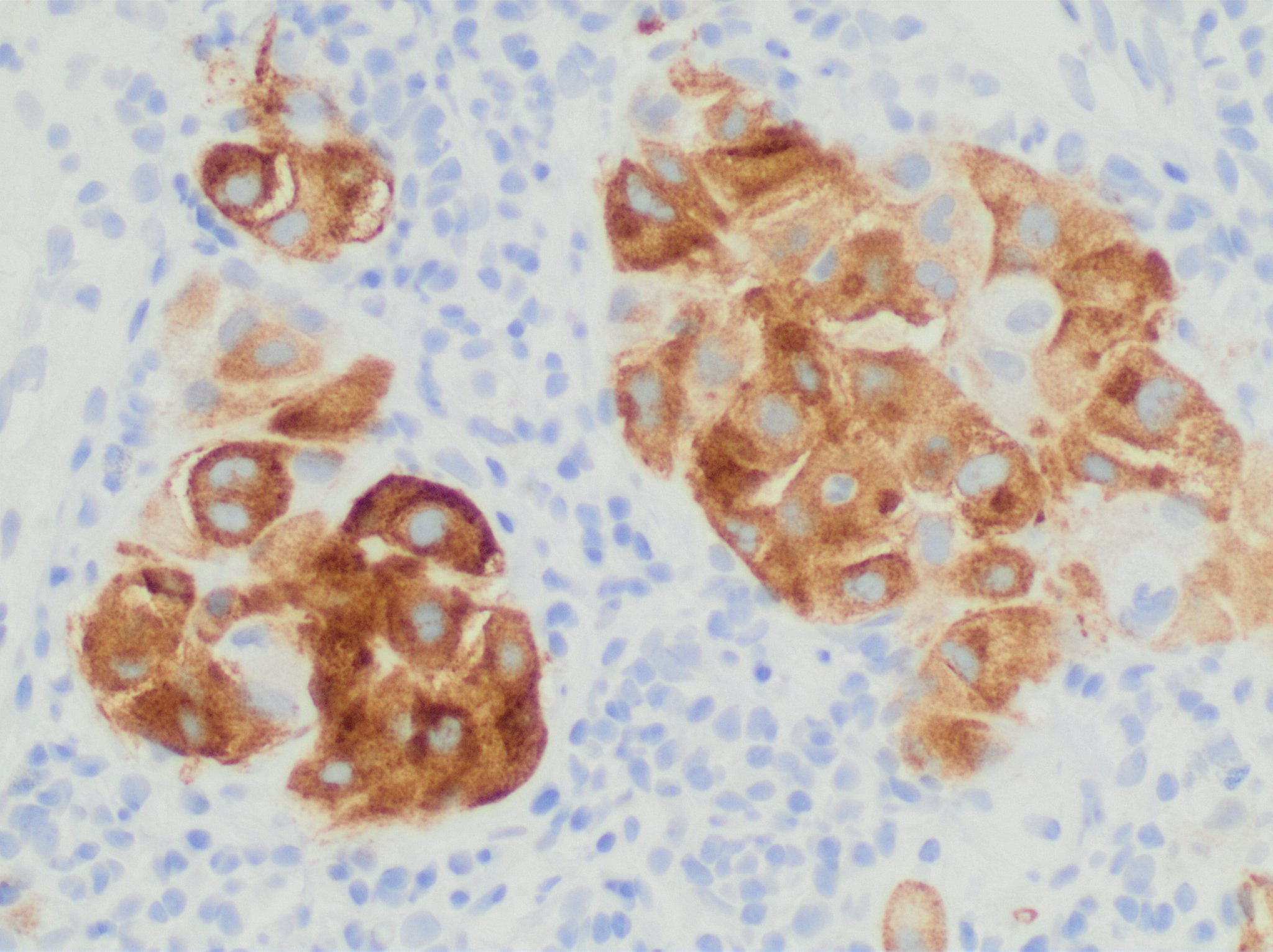
Immunohistochemistry stain for Melan-A in a poorly differentiated metastatic melanoma to a lymph node, helping in its diagnosis

Protein melan-A also known as melanoma antigen recognized by T cells 1 or MART-1 is a protein that in humans is encoded by the MLANA or "MALENA" gene. A fragment of the protein, usually consisting of the nine amino acids 27 to 35, is bound by MHC class I complexes which present it to T cells of the immune system. These complexes can be found on the surface of melanoma cells. Decameric peptides (26-35) are being investigated as cancer vaccines.

== Discovery and nomenclature ==
The names MART-1 and melan-A were coined by two groups of researchers who independently sequenced the gene for this antigen in 1994. Both names are currently in common use. Kawakami et al. at the National Cancer Institute coined the term MART-1, which stands for "melanoma antigen recognized by T-cells". Coulie et al. of Belgium called the gene melan-A, presumably an abbreviation for "melanocyte antigen".

== Clinical significance ==
MART-1/melan-A is a protein antigen that is found on the surface of melanocytes. Antibodies against the antigen are used in the medical specialty of anatomic pathology in order to recognize cells of melanocytic differentiation, useful for the diagnosis of a melanoma. The same name is also used to refer to the gene which codes for the antigen.

The MART-1/melan-A antigen is specific for the melanocyte lineage, found in normal skin, the retina, and melanocytes, but not in other normal tissues. It is thus useful as a marker for melanocytic tumors (melanomas) with the caveat that it is normally found in benign nevi as well.

In many immunological studies melan-A peptides serve as a positive control for T-cell priming experiments. This is due to the fact that its high precursor frequency of about 1/1000 among cytotoxic T-cells makes it easy for antigen presenting cells to evoke peptide-specific responses.

== Structure ==
MART-1/melan-A is a putative 13 kDa transmembrane protein consisting of 118 amino acids. It has a single transmembrane domain.

== Regulation ==
Its expression is regulated by the microphthalmia-associated transcription factor.
