= Tisagenlecleucel =

Gene therapy medication

Clinical data
- Pronunciation: /ˌtɪsəˌdʒɛnlɛkˈluːsɛl/ TIS-ə-JEN-lek-LOO-sel
- Trade names: Kymriah
- Other names: CTL019, CART-19, tisa-cel
- AHFS/Drugs.com: Professional Drug Facts
- MedlinePlus: a617053
- License data: US DailyMed: Tisagenlecleucel
- Pregnancy category: AU: C
- Routes of administration: Intravenous
- ATC code: L01XL04 (WHO)

Legal status
- Legal status: AU: C4 (class 4 biological); CA: ℞-only / Schedule D; US: ℞-only; EU: Rx-only

Pharmacokinetic data
- Elimination half-life: 16.8 days

Identifiers
- CAS Number: 1823078-37-0
- DrugBank: DB13881
- UNII: Q6C9WHR03O
- KEGG: D11386

Tisagenlecleucel, sold under the brand name Kymriah, is a CAR T cells medication for the treatment of B-cell acute lymphoblastic leukemia (ALL) which uses the body's own T cells to fight cancer (adoptive cell transfer).

The most common serious side effects are cytokine release syndrome (a potentially life-threatening condition that can cause fever, vomiting, shortness of breath, pain and low blood pressure) and decreases in platelets (components that help the blood to clot), hemoglobin (the protein found in red blood cells that carries oxygen around the body) or white blood cells including neutrophils and lymphocytes.

T cells from a person with cancer are removed, genetically engineered to make a specific chimeric cell surface receptor with components from both a T-cell receptor and an antibody specific to a protein on the cancer cell, and transferred back to the person. The T cells are engineered to target a protein called CD19 that is common on B cells. A chimeric T cell receptor ("CAR-T") is expressed on the surface of the T cell.

The platform invented at the University of Pennsylvania was clinically developed by Novartis, including market authorization, and real world evidence. In August 2017, it became the first FDA-approved treatment that included a gene therapy step in the United States.

== Medical uses ==
Tisagenlecleucel is indicated for the treatment of those under 25 years of age with B-cell precursor acute lymphoblastic leukemia (ALL) that is refractory or in second or later relapse; or adults with relapsed or refractory (r/r) large B-cell lymphoma after two or more lines of systemic therapy including diffuse large B-cell lymphoma (DLBCL) not otherwise specified, high grade B-cell lymphoma and DLBCL arising from follicular lymphoma.

In May 2022, the indication in the US was updated to include the treatment of adults with relapsed or refractory follicular lymphoma (FL) after two or more lines of systemic therapy.

== Adverse effects ==
A frequent side effect seen is cytokine release syndrome (CRS).

Serious side effects occur in most patients. The most common serious side effects are cytokine release syndrome (a potentially life-threatening condition that can cause fever, vomiting, shortness of breath, pain and low blood pressure) and decreases in platelets (components that help the blood to clot), hemoglobin (the protein found in red blood cells that carries oxygen around the body) or white blood cells including neutrophils and lymphocytes. Serious infections occur in around three in ten diffuse large B-cell lymphoma (DLBCL) patients.

In April 2024, the FDA label boxed warning was expanded to include T cell malignancies.

== History ==
The treatment was developed by a group headed by Carl H. June and co-invented by Michael C. Milone at the University of Pennsylvania, and is licensed to Novartis.

In April 2017, tisagenlecleucel received breakthrough therapy designation by the U.S. Food and Drug Administration (FDA) for the treatment of relapsed or refractory diffuse large B-cell lymphoma.

In July 2017, an FDA advisory committee unanimously recommended that the agency approve it to treat B cell acute lymphoblastic leukemia that did not respond adequately to other treatments or have relapsed.

In August 2017, the FDA granted approval for the use of tisagenlecleucel in people with acute lymphoblastic leukemia. According to Novartis, the treatment will be administered at specific medical centers where staff have been trained to manage possible reactions to this new type of treatment.

In May 2018, the FDA further approved tisagenlecleucel to treat adults with relapsed or refractory diffuse large B-cell lymphoma (DLBCL), based on results from the JULIET phase II trial.

In England, the NHS will use the procedure to treat children with acute lymphoblastic leukemia (ALL) if earlier treatments including stem cell transplants have failed; it is expected to apply to between 15 and 20 children. In March 2019, NICE issued guidance approving Kymriah for treatment of relapsed or refractory diffuse large B-cell lymphoma in adults after 2 or more systemic therapies.

== Manufacture ==
In a 22-day process, the treatment is customized for each person. T cells are purified from blood drawn from the person, and those cells are then modified by a virus that inserts a gene into the cells' genome. The gene encodes a chimaeric antigen receptor (CAR) that targets leukaemia cells. It uses the 4-1BB co-stimulatory domain in its CAR to improve response.

Modification of the cells to create the customized therapeutic has been a major bottleneck in expanding availability of the treatment, requiring T cells extracted in Europe to be transported to the United States where they are modified, then back to Europe. Novartis has been expanding a facility in France, and constructed a new facility in Stein, Switzerland, to relieve this bottleneck beginning in 2020. Novartis uses the company Cryoport Inc. for temperature-controlled transportation required for the manufacture and distribution of Kymriah.

== Society and culture ==
=== Names ===
Tisagenlecleucel is the international nonproprietary name.
