= James N. Kochenderfer =

American physician-scientist

James N. Kochenderfer is an American physician-scientist. He is currently a Senior Investigator at the National Cancer Institute, National Institutes of Health, Bethesda, Maryland.

== Education and early career ==
Kochenderfer obtained a bachelor's degree in chemistry and a M.D. at West Virginia University. He completed an Internal Medicine residency at Vanderbilt University followed by an Oncology Fellowship at the University of Texas M.D. Anderson Cancer Center in Houston, Texas. He completed a Hematology Fellowship at Baylor College of Medicine in Houston, Texas. He then undertook a period of post-doctoral training in cancer vaccines and adoptive T-cell therapy at the National Cancer Institute. This training was conducted in the laboratories of Dr. Ronald E. Gress and Dr. Steven A. Rosenberg. Following these fellowships, Dr. Kochenderfer held positions as an Assistant Clinical Investigator and then an Investigator at the National Cancer Institute. In 2020, Dr. Kochenderfer was granted tenure and assumed his current position of Senior Investigator.

Kochenderfer is an investigator and author in the field of chimeric antigen receptor (CAR) T-cell therapies for cancer. Dr. Kochenderfer's research has focused on developing new CAR T-cell therapies for hematologic malignancies such as leukemia, lymphoma, and multiple myeloma. Dr. Kochenderfer was the lead author of the first paper to report antigen-specific activity of CAR T cells targeting CD19. Dr. Kochenderfer and coworkers conducted early studies that demonstrated the effectiveness of anti-CD19 CAR T cells against lymphoma. CAR T cells targeting CD19 have gone on to become U.S. Food and Drug Administration (FDA)-approved treatments for lymphoma and leukemia. Dr. Kochenderfer and coworkers were also the first to report CAR T cells targeting B-cell maturation antigen. CAR T cells targeting BCMA are an FDA-approved treatment for multiple myeloma. Dr. Kochenderfer contributed to early development of the first FDA-approved CAR T-cell therapy for multiple myeloma.

== Selected publications ==
- Kochenderfer, J. N.; Wilson, W. H.; Janik, J. E.; Dudley, M. E.; Stetler-Stevenson, M.; Feldman, S. A.; Maric, I.; Raffeld, M.; Nathan, D. A.; Lanier, B. J.; Morgan, R. A.; Rosenberg, S. A. (2010). "Eradication of B-lineage cells and regression of lymphoma in a patient treated with autologous T cells genetically engineered to recognize CD19". Blood. 116 (20). National Library of Medicine: 4099–4102. doi:10.1182/blood-2010-04-281931. PMC 2993617. PMID 20668228.
- Kochenderfer, J. N.; Dudley, M. E.; Kassim, S. H.; Somerville, R. P.; Carpenter, R. O.; Stetler-Stevenson, M.; Yang, J. C.; Phan, G. Q.; Hughes, M. S.; Sherry, R. M.; Raffeld, M.; Feldman, S.; Lu, L.; Li, Y. F.; Ngo, L. T.; Goy, A.; Feldman, T.; Spaner, D. E.; Wang, M. L.; Chen, C. C.; Kranick, S. M.; Nath, A.; Nathan, D. A.; Morton, K. E.; Toomey, M. A.; Rosenberg, S. A. (2015). "Chemotherapy-refractory diffuse large B-cell lymphoma and indolent B-cell malignancies can be effectively treated with autologous T cells expressing an anti-CD19 chimeric antigen receptor". Journal of Clinical Oncology. 33 (6). National Library of Medicine: 540–549. doi:10.1200/JCO.2014.56.2025. PMC 4322257. PMID 25154820.
- Carpenter, R. O.; Evbuomwan, M. O.; Pittaluga, S.; Rose, J. J.; Raffeld, M.; Yang, S.; Gress, R. E.; Hakim, F. T.; Kochenderfer, J. N. (2013). "B-cell maturation antigen is a promising target for adoptive T-cell therapy of multiple myeloma". Clinical Cancer Research. 19 (8). National Library of Medicine: 2048–2060. doi:10.1158/1078-0432.CCR-12-2422. PMC 3630268. PMID 23344265.
- Ali, S. A.; Shi, V.; Maric, I.; Wang, M.; Stroncek, D. F.; Rose, J. J.; Brudno, J. N.; Stetler-Stevenson, M.; Feldman, S. A.; Hansen, B. G.; Fellowes, V. S.; Hakim, F. T.; Gress, R. E.; Kochenderfer, J. N. (2016). "T cells expressing an anti-B-cell maturation antigen chimeric antigen receptor cause remissions of multiple myeloma". Blood. 128 (13). National Library of Medicine: 1688–2300. doi:10.1182/blood-2016-04-711903. PMC 5043125. PMID 27412889.
- Raje, Noopur; Berdeja, Jesus; Lin, Yi; Siegel, David; Jagannath, Sundar; Madduri, Deepu; Liedtke, Michaela; Rosenblatt, Jacalyn; Maus, Marcela V.; Turka, Ashley; Lam, Lyh-Ping; Morgan, Richard A.; Friedman, Kevin; Massaro, Monica; Wang, Julie; Russotti, Greg; Yang, Zhihong; Campbell, Timothy; Hege, Kristen; Petrocca, Fabio; Quigley, M. Travis; Munshi, Nikhil; Kochenderfer, James N. (2019). "Anti-BCMA CAR T-Cell Therapy bb2121 in Relapsed or Refractory Multiple Myeloma". New England Journal of Medicine. 380 (18): 1726–1737. doi:10.1056/NEJMoa1817226. PMC 8202968. PMID 31042825.
- Brudno, J. N.; Lam, N.; Vanasse, D.; Shen, Y. W.; Rose, J. J.; Rossi, J.; Xue, A.; Bot, A.; Scholler, N.; Mikkilineni, L.; Roschewski, M.; Dean, R.; Cachau, R.; Youkharibache, P.; Patel, R.; Hansen, B.; Stroncek, D. F.; Rosenberg, S. A.; Gress, R. E.; Kochenderfer, J. N. (2020). "Safety and feasibility of anti-CD19 CAR T cells with fully human binding domains in patients with B-cell lymphoma". Nature Medicine. 26 (2). National Library of Medicine: 270–280. doi:10.1038/s41591-019-0737-3. PMC 7781235. PMID 31959992.

== Selected awards ==
- American Society of Gene and Cell Therapy Outstanding New Investigator Award, 2017
- Foundation of the National Institutes of Health Trailblazer Award, 2019.
- Elected member of the American Society for Clinical Investigation, 2020.
- Top 10 Clinical Research Achievement Award, 2020.
- NIH Director's Award, 2020.
