= Ciltacabtagene autoleucel =

Gene therapy medication used to treat multiple myeloma

Clinical data
- Trade names: Carvykti
- Other names: JNJ-68284528, cilta-cel
- AHFS/Drugs.com: Micromedex Detailed Consumer Information
- MedlinePlus: a622041
- License data: US DailyMed: Ciltacabtagene autoleucel
- Pregnancy category: AU: C
- Routes of administration: Intravenous
- Drug class: Antineoplastic
- ATC code: L01XL05 (WHO)

Legal status
- Legal status: AU: C4 (class 4 biological); CA: ℞-only / Schedule D; US: ℞-only; EU: Rx-only

Identifiers
- DrugBank: DB16738
- UNII: 0L1F17908Q
- KEGG: D12315

Ciltacabtagene autoleucel, sold under the brand name Carvykti, is an anti-cancer medication used to treat multiple myeloma. Ciltacabtagene autoleucel is a BCMA (B-cell maturation antigen)-directed genetically modified autologous chimeric antigen receptor (CAR) T-cell therapy. Each dose is customized using the recipient's own T-cells, which are collected, genetically modified, and infused back into the recipient.

The most common adverse reactions include pyrexia, hypogammaglobulinemia, musculoskeletal pain, fatigue, infections, diarrhea, nausea, encephalopathy, headache, coagulopathy, constipation, and vomiting. Additional common side effects include neutropenia (low levels of neutrophils), lymphopenia and leucopenia (low levels of lymphocytes or other white blood cells), anemia (low levels of red blood cells), thrombocytopenia (low levels of blood platelets), hypotension (low blood pressure), pain of the muscles and bones, high level of liver enzymes, upper respiratory tract infection (nose and throat infection), diarrhea, hypokalemia (low level of potassium), hypocalcemia (low levels of calcium), hypophosphatemia (low levels of phosphate in the blood), nausea, headache, cough, tachycardia (rapid heartbeat), encephalopathy (a brain disorder), edema (fluid retention), decreased appetite, chills, fever, tiredness, as well as cytokine release syndrome (a potentially life-threatening condition that can cause fever, vomiting, shortness of breath, pain and low blood pressure).

Ciltacabtagene autoleucel was approved for medical use in the United States in February 2022, and in the European Union in May 2022.

== Medical uses ==
Ciltacabtagene autoleucel is indicated for the treatment of adults with relapsed or refractory multiple myeloma after one or more prior lines of therapy, including a proteasome inhibitor and an immunomodulatory agent, and are refractory to lenalidomide.

== Adverse effects ==
In April 2024, the FDA label boxed warning was expanded to include T cell malignancies. In October 2025, the FDA approved a label boxed warning that ciltacabtagene autoleucel can also cause a severe form of enterocolitis, i.e., inflammation of the small and large intestines termed immune effector cell-associated enterocolitis. This warning followed A study showing that 2.2% (i.e., 13 cases) of patients with multiple myeloma in 11 different treatment centers developed this form of enteritis.

== History ==
The safety and efficacy of ciltacabtagene autoleucel were evaluated in CARTITUDE-1 (NCT03548207), an open label, multicenter clinical trial evaluating ciltacabtagene autoleucel in 97 participants with relapsed or refractory multiple myeloma who received at least three prior lines of therapy which included a proteasome inhibitor, an immunomodulatory agent, and an anti-CD38 monoclonal antibody and who had disease progression on or after the last chemotherapy regimen; 82% had received four or more prior lines of antimyeloma therapy.

The U.S. Food and Drug Administration (FDA) granted the application for ciltacabtagene autoleucel priority review, breakthrough therapy, and orphan drug designations.

== Society and culture ==
=== Legal status ===
In March 2022, the Committee for Medicinal Products for Human Use (CHMP) of the European Medicines Agency (EMA) adopted a positive opinion, recommending the granting of a conditional marketing authorization for the medicinal product Carvykti, intended for the treatment of adults with relapsed and refractory multiple myeloma. The applicant for this medicinal product is Janssen-Cilag International NV. Ciltacabtagene autoleucel was approved for medical use in the European Union in May 2022.

=== Names ===
Ciltacabtagene autoleucel is the international nonproprietary name.
