= Axicabtagene ciloleucel =

Medication to treat large B-cell lymphoma

Clinical data
- Trade names: Yescarta
- Other names: KTE-C19, Axi-cel
- AHFS/Drugs.com: Monograph
- MedlinePlus: a618003
- License data: US DailyMed: Axicabtagene_ciloleucel
- Pregnancy category: AU: C
- Routes of administration: Intravenous injection
- ATC code: L01XL03 (WHO)

Legal status
- Legal status: AU: Class 4 biological; CA: ℞-only / Schedule D; UK: POM (Prescription only); US: ℞-only; EU: Rx-only

Identifiers
- DrugBank: DB13915
- UNII: U2I8T43Y7R
- KEGG: D11144

Axicabtagene ciloleucel, sold under the brand name Yescarta, is a medication used for the treatment for large B-cell lymphoma that has failed conventional treatment. T cells are removed from a person with lymphoma and genetically engineered to produce a specific T-cell receptor. The resulting chimeric antigen receptor T cells (CAR-Ts) that react to the cancer are then given back to the person to populate the bone marrow. Axicabtagene treatment carries a risk for cytokine release syndrome (CRS) and neurological toxicities.

Due to CD19 being a pan-B cell marker, the T-cells that are engineered to target CD19 receptors on the cancerous B cells also influence normal B cells, except some plasma cells.

== Adverse effects ==
Because treatment with axicabtagene carries a risk of cytokine release syndrome and neurological toxicities, the Food and Drug Administration (FDA) has mandated that hospitals be certified for its use prior to treatment of any patients.

In April 2024, the FDA label boxed warning was expanded to include T cell malignancies.

== History ==
It was developed by California-based Kite Pharma.

Axicabtagene ciloleucel was awarded U.S. FDA breakthrough therapy designation in October 2017, for diffuse large B-cell lymphoma, transformed follicular lymphoma, and primary mediastinal B-cell lymphoma. It also received priority review and orphan drug designation.

Based on the ZUMA-1 trial, Kite submitted a biologics license application for axicabtagene in March 2017, for the treatment of non-Hodgkin lymphoma.

The FDA granted approval in October 2017, for the second-line treatment of diffuse large B-cell lymphoma.

In April 2022, the FDA approved axicabtagene ciloleucel for adults with large B-cell lymphoma (LBCL) that is refractory to first-line chemoimmunotherapy or relapses within twelve months of first-line chemoimmunotherapy. It is not indicated for the treatment of patients with primary central nervous system lymphoma.

Approval was based on ZUMA-7, a randomized, open-label, multicenter trial in adults with primary refractory LBCL or relapse within twelve months following completion of first-line therapy. Participants had not yet received treatment for relapsed or refractory lymphoma and were potential candidates for autologous hematopoietic stem cell transplantation (HSCT). A total of 359 participants were randomized 1:1 to receive a single infusion of axicabtagene ciloleucel following fludarabine and cyclophosphamide lymphodepleting chemotherapy or to receive second-line standard therapy, consisting of two or three cycles of chemoimmunotherapy followed by high-dose therapy and autologous HSCT in participants who attained complete remission or partial remission. In the ZUMA-7 trial, patients treated with axicabtagene ciloleucel had superior clinical outcomes compared with the previous standard of care, including improved overall survival with an estimated 4-year overall survival rate of 54.6% for axicabtagene ciloleucel, compared with 46% for the previous standard of care.

In January 2023, the National Institute for Health and Care Excellence (NICE) recommended axicabtagene ciloleucel to treat adult patients with diffuse large B-cell lymphoma (DLBCL) or primary mediastinal large B-cell lymphoma (PMBCL) who have already been treated with two or more systemic therapies.

== Society and culture ==
=== Names ===
Axicabtagene ciloleucel is the international nonproprietary name.
