= T-cell surface glycoprotein CD3 zeta chain =

Protein found in humans

CD247
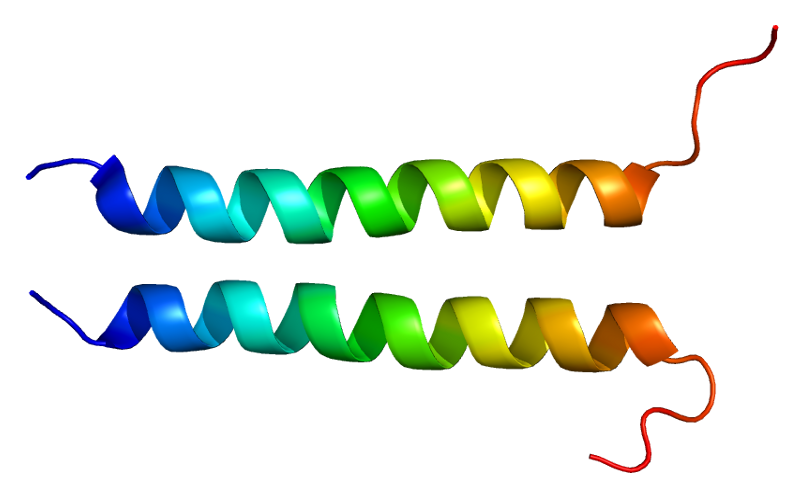

Identifiers
- Aliases: CD247, CD3-ZETA, CD3H, CD3Q, CD3Z, IMD25, T3Z, TCRZ, CD247 molecule, CD3zeta
- External IDs: OMIM: 186780; MGI: 88334; GeneCards: CD247
Available structures
PDB	Ortholog search: PDBe RCSB
PDB	List of PDB id codes 1TCE, 1YGR, 2HAC, 2OQ1, 3IK5, 3IOZ, 4XZ1

Gene location (Human)
Chr.	Chromosome 1 (human)
Band	1q24.2	Start	167,430,640 bp
Band	1q24.2	End	167,518,610 bp

Gene location (Mouse)
Chr.	Chromosome 1 (mouse)
Band	1 H2.3|1 73.14 cM	Start	165,616,250 bp
Band	1 H2.3|1 73.14 cM	End	165,704,846 bp
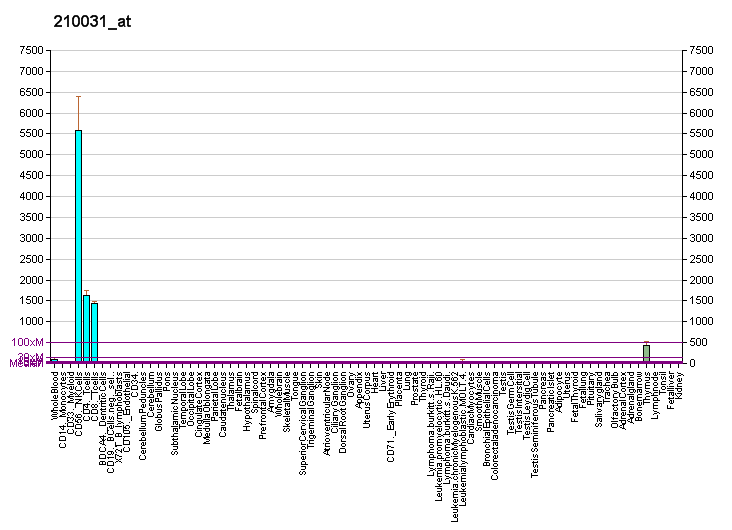
RNA expression pattern
Bgee	Human / Mouse (ortholog); Top expressed in: granulocyte; thymus; blood; gonad; lymph node; spleen; appendix; testicle; bone marrow; bone marrow cell / Top expressed in: thymus; mesenteric lymph nodes; blood; aortic valve; ascending aorta; tail of embryo; spleen; subcutaneous adipose tissue; genital tubercle; spermatid; More reference expression data
BioGPS	More reference expression data
Gene ontology
Molecular function	protein binding; transmembrane signaling receptor activity; identical protein binding; protein homodimerization activity; protein tyrosine kinase binding
Cellular component	cytoplasm; integral component of membrane; alpha-beta T cell receptor complex; plasma membrane; T cell receptor complex; membrane
Biological process	cell surface receptor signaling pathway; mitigation of host defenses by virus; T cell receptor signaling pathway; Fc-gamma receptor signaling pathway involved in phagocytosis; regulation of immune response; viral process; protein homotetramerization; protein homotrimerization; adaptive immune response; immune system process; interleukin-2 production; positive regulation of protein localization to cell surface
Sources:Amigo / QuickGO
Orthologs
Databases	NCBI: entry; OMA: entry
Species	Human	Mouse
Entrez	919	12503
Ensembl	ENSG00000198821	ENSMUSG00000005763
UniProt	P20963	Q3UU54; P24161
RefSeq (mRNA)	NM_000734; NM_198053; NM_001378515; NM_001378516	NM_001113391; NM_001113392; NM_001113393; NM_001113394; NM_031162
RefSeq (protein)	NP_000725; NP_932170; NP_001365444; NP_001365445	NP_112439.1; NP_001106862.1; NP_001106862; NP_001106863; NP_001106864 NP_112439
Location (UCSC)	Chr 1: 167.43 – 167.52 Mb	Chr 1: 165.62 – 165.7 Mb
PubMed search
- Wikidata
View/Edit Human	View/Edit Mouse

T-cell surface glycoprotein CD3 zeta chain also known as T-cell receptor T3 zeta chain or CD247 (Cluster of Differentiation 247) is a protein that in humans is encoded by the CD247 gene.

Some older literature mention a similar protein called "CD3 eta" in mice. It is now understood to be an isoform differing in the last exon.

== Gene ==
The gene is located on the long arm of chromosome 1 at location 1q22-q25 on the Crick (negative) strand. The encoded protein is 164 amino acids long with a predicted weight of 18.696 kiloDaltons.

Two alternatively spliced transcript variants encoding distinct isoforms have been found for this gene.

== Function ==
T-cell receptor zeta (ζ), together with T-cell receptor αβ or γδ heterodimers and CD3 γ, δ, and ε units, forms the T-cell receptor-CD3 complex. The ζ chain appears in this complex as a disulfide-linked homodimer and appears to be necessary for the assembly of T-cell receptor components in the endoplasmic reticulum and trafficking to the plasma membrane in an adaptor protein-like manner. Absence of the ζ chain results in a failure of exocytosis and direction of the other receptor components to lysosomes for degradation.

The ζ chain plays an important role in coupling antigen recognition to several intracellular signal-transduction pathways. Propagation of the T-cell receptor intracellular signaling cascade relies on cytosolic phosphorylation of tyrosine residues within conserved Immunoreceptor Tyrosine-based Activation Motif (ITAM) domains by Src family kinases to produce binding sites for other, downstream proteins (e.g., SH2 proteins, including ZAP-70). The cytoplasmic tails of each CD3 γ, δ, and ε chain contain one such domain, while those of each ζ chain contain three. Thus, a total of six out of ten ITAMs on each T-cell receptor are found on the ζ chains. Given that the quantity of signaling through the T cell receptor conveys important information that determines such cellular responses as survival during selection, anergy, and functional avidity maturation, the signaling function of the ζ chain cannot be considered redundant despite the presence of ITAMs on the other chains. Low expression results in an impaired immune response.

== Interactions ==
CD247 has been shown to interact with Janus kinase 3 and Protein unc-119 homolog.

== See also ==
- Cluster of differentiation
- ZAP70
