= Cytokine release syndrome =

Chain reaction of white blood cell activation

- Other names: Infusion-related reaction (IRR), infusion reaction, cytokine storm
- Specialty: Immunology

In immunology, cytokine release syndrome (CRS) is a form of systemic inflammatory response syndrome (SIRS) that can be triggered by a variety of factors such as infections and certain drugs. It refers to cytokine storm syndromes (CSS) and occurs when large numbers of white blood cells are activated and release inflammatory cytokines, which in turn activate yet more white blood cells. CRS is also an adverse effect of some monoclonal antibody medications, as well as adoptive T-cell therapies.

The term cytokine storm is often used interchangeably with CRS but, despite the fact that they have similar clinical phenotype, their characteristics are different. When occurring as a result of a therapy, CRS symptoms may be delayed until days or weeks after treatment. Immediate-onset CRS is a cytokine storm, although severe cases of CRS have also been called cytokine storms.

== Signs and symptoms ==
Symptoms include fever that tends to fluctuate, fatigue, loss of appetite, muscle and joint pain, nausea, vomiting, diarrhea, rashes, fast breathing, rapid heartbeat, low blood pressure, seizures, headache, confusion, delirium, hallucinations, tremor, and loss of coordination.

Lab tests and clinical monitoring show low blood oxygen, widened pulse pressure, increased cardiac output (early), potentially diminished cardiac output (late), high levels of nitrogen compounds in the blood, elevated D-dimer, elevated transaminases, factor I deficiency and excessive bleeding, higher-than-normal level of bilirubin.

== Cause ==
CRS occurs when large numbers of white blood cells, including B cells, T cells, natural killer cells, macrophages, dendritic cells, and monocytes are activated and release inflammatory cytokines, which activate more white blood cells in a positive feedback loop of pathogenic inflammation. Immune cells are activated by stressed or infected cells through receptor-ligand interactions.

This can occur when the immune system is fighting pathogens, as cytokines produced by immune cells recruit more effector immune cells such as T-cells and inflammatory monocytes (which differentiate into macrophages) to the site of inflammation or infection. In addition, pro-inflammatory cytokines binding their cognate receptor on immune cells results in activation and stimulation of further cytokine production.

Adoptive cell transfer of autologous T-cells modified with chimeric antigen receptors (CAR-T cell therapy) also causes CRS. Serum samples of patients with CAR-T associated CRS have elevated levels of IL-6, IFN-γ, IL-8 (CXCL8), IL-10, GM-CSF, MIP-1α/β, MCP-1 (CCL2), CXCL9, and CXCL10 (IP-10). The most predictive biomarkers 36h after CAR-T infusion of CRS are a fever ≥38.9 °C (102 °F) and elevated levels of MCP-1 in serum. Many of the cytokines elevated in CRS are not produced by CAR-T cells, but by myeloid cells that are pathogenically licensed through T-cell-mediated activating mechanisms. For example, in vitro co-culture experiments have demonstrated IL-6, MCP-1, and MIP-1 are not produced by CAR-T cells, but rather by inflammatory myeloid lineage cells. In vivo models have demonstrated NSG (NOD/SCID/γ-chain deficient mice) with defects of both lymphocyte and myeloid lineage compartments do not develop CRS after CAR-T cell infusion.

In addition to adoptive T-cell therapies, severe CRS or cytokine reactions can occur in a number of infectious and non-infectious diseases including graft-versus-host disease (GVHD), coronavirus disease 2019 (COVID-19), acute respiratory distress syndrome (ARDS), sepsis, Ebola, avian influenza, smallpox, and systemic inflammatory response syndrome (SIRS).

Although severe acute respiratory syndrome coronavirus 2 (SARS-CoV-2) is sufficiently cleared by the early acute phase anti-viral response in most individuals, some progress to a hyperinflammatory condition, often with life-threatening pulmonary involvement. This systemic hyperinflammation results in inflammatory lymphocytic and monocytic infiltration of the lung and the heart, causing ARDS and cardiac failure. Patients with fulminant COVID-19 and ARDS have classical serum biomarkers of CRS including elevated CRP, LDH, IL-6, and ferritin.

Hemophagocytic lymphohistiocytosis and Epstein-Barr virus-related hemophagocytic lymphohistiocytosis are caused by extreme elevations in cytokines and can be regarded as one form of severe cytokine release syndrome.

=== Medications ===
Cytokine reaction syndrome may also be induced by certain medications, such as the CD20 antibody rituximab and the CD19 CAR T cell tisagenlecleucel. The experimental drug TGN1412—also known as Theralizumab—caused extremely serious symptoms when given to six participants in a Phase I trial. A controlled and limited CRS is triggered by active fever therapy with mixed bacterial vaccines (MBV) according to Coley; it is used for oncological and certain chronic diseases. CRS has also arisen with biotherapeutics such as COVID-19 vaccines (Frontiers of Immunology 2022 13: 967226) and monoclonal antibodies intended to suppress or activate the immune system through receptors on white blood cells. Muromonab-CD3, an anti-CD3 monoclonal antibody intended to suppress the immune system to prevent rejection of organ transplants; alemtuzumab, which is anti-CD52 and used to treat blood cancers as well as multiple sclerosis and in organ transplants; and rituximab, which is anti-CD20 and used to treat blood cancers and auto-immune disorders, all cause CRS.

== Diagnosis ==
CRS needs to be distinguished from symptoms of the disease itself and, in the case of drugs, from other adverse effects; for example, tumor lysis syndrome requires different interventions. As of 2015, differential diagnoses depended on the judgement of doctors, as there were no objective tests.

=== Classification ===
CRS is a form of systemic inflammatory response syndrome and is an adverse effect of some drugs.

The Common Terminology Criteria for Adverse Events classifications for CRS as of version 4.03 issued in 2010 were:

Grades	Toxicity
Grade 1	Mild reaction, infusion interruption not indicated; intervention not indicated
Grade 2	Therapy or infusion interruption indicated but responds promptly to symptomatic treatment (e.g., antihistamines, NSAIDS, narcotics, IV fluids); prophylactic medications indicated for <=24 hrs
Grade 3	Prolonged (e.g., not rapidly responsive to symptomatic medication or brief interruption of infusion); recurrence of symptoms following initial improvement; hospitalization indicated for clinical sequelae (e.g., renal impairment, pulmonary infiltrates)
Grade 4	Life-threatening consequences; pressor or ventilatory support indicated
Grade 5	Death

== Prevention ==
Severe CRS caused by some drugs can be prevented by using lower doses, infusing slowly, and administering anti-histamines or corticosteroids before and during administration of the drug.

In vitro assays have been developed to understand the risk that pre-clinical drug candidates might cause CRS and guide dosing for Phase I trials, and regulatory agencies expect to see results of such tests in investigational new drug applications.

A modified Chandler loop model can be used as a preclinical tool to assess infusion reactions.

== Management ==
Treatment for less severe CRS is supportive, addressing the symptoms like fever, muscle pain, or fatigue. Moderate CRS requires oxygen therapy and giving fluids and antihypotensive agents to raise blood pressure. For moderate to severe CRS, the use of immunosuppressive agents like corticosteroids may be necessary, but judgment must be used to avoid negating the effect of drugs intended to activate the immune system.

Tocilizumab, an anti-IL-6 monoclonal antibody, was FDA approved for steroid-refractory CRS based on retrospective case study data.

Lenzilumab, an anti-GM-CSF monoclonal antibody, is also clinically proven to be effective at managing cytokine release by reducing activation of myeloid cells and decreasing the production of IL-1, IL-6, MCP-1, MIP-1, and IP-10. Additionally, as a soluble cytokine blockade, it will not increase serum levels of GM-CSF (a phenomenon seen with tocilizumab and IL-6).

Although frequently used to treat severe CRS in people with ARDS, corticosteroids and NSAIDs have been evaluated in clinical trials and have shown no effect on lung mechanics, gas exchange, or beneficial outcome in early established ARDS.

== Epidemiology ==
Severe CRS is rare. Minor and moderate CRS are common side effects of immune-modulating antibody therapies and CAR-T therapies.

== Research ==
Key therapeutic targets to abrogate hyper-inflammation in CRS are IL-1, IL-6, and GM-CSF. An in vivo model found that GM-CSF knockout CAR-T cells do not induce CRS in mice. However, IL-1 knockout and IL-6 knockout hosts (whose myeloid cells are deficient in IL-1 and IL-6, respectively) were susceptible to CRS after the administration of wild-type CAR-T cells. It is thought this may be because while blockade of IL-1 and IL-6 are myeloid-derived cytokines are thus too far downstream of the inflammatory cascade. Moreover, while tocilizumab (anti-IL-6R monoclonal antibody) may have an anti-inflammatory and antipyretic effect, it has been shown to increase serum levels of IL-6 by saturating the receptor, thus driving the cytokine across the blood brain barrier (BBB) and worsening neurotoxicity. Monoclonal antibody blockade of GM-CSF with lenzilumab has been demonstrated to protect mice from CAR-T associated CRS and neurotoxicity while maintaining anti-leukemic efficacy.

== See also ==
- Macrophage activation syndrome
- sHLH
