= HIPK2 =

Protein-coding gene in the species Homo sapiens

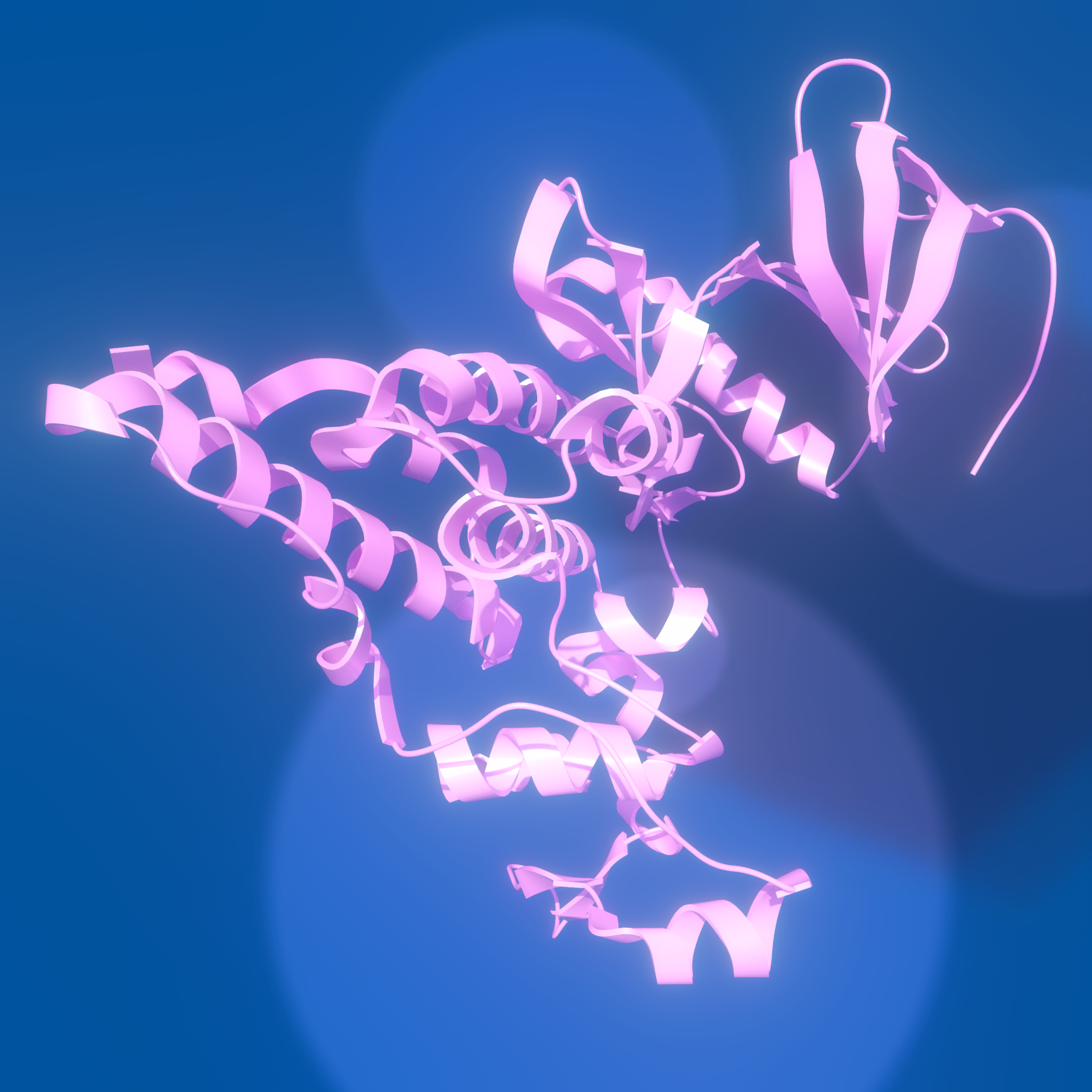

Identifiers
- Aliases: HIPK2, PRO0593, homeodomain interacting protein kinase 2
- External IDs: OMIM: 606868; MGI: 1314872; GeneCards: HIPK2
Enzyme activity
EC #	BRENDA	ExPASy	KEGG	MetaCyc
2.7.11.1	↗	↗	↗	↗

Gene location (Human)
Chr.	Chromosome 7 (human)
Band	7q34	Start	139,561,570 bp
Band	7q34	End	139,777,998 bp

Gene location (Mouse)
Chr.	Chromosome 6 (mouse)
Band	6|6 B1	Start	38,671,325 bp
Band	6|6 B1	End	38,853,099 bp
RNA expression pattern
Bgee	Human / Mouse (ortholog); Top expressed in: internal globus pallidus; inferior ganglion of vagus nerve; ventral tegmental area; subthalamic nucleus; external globus pallidus; superior vestibular nucleus; pars reticulata; renal medulla; pars compacta; pons / Top expressed in: vestibular membrane of cochlear duct; genital tubercle; Rostral migratory stream; tail of embryo; lumbar subsegment of spinal cord; knee joint; right ventricle; secondary oocyte; triceps brachii muscle; deep cerebellar nuclei; More reference expression data
BioGPS	n/a
Gene ontology
Molecular function	nucleotide binding; transcription coactivator activity; SMAD binding; transferase activity; kinase activity; virion binding; ATP binding; protein binding; protein kinase activity; transcription corepressor activity; protein serine/threonine kinase activity
Cellular component	cytoplasm; PML body; RNA polymerase II transcription regulator complex; nuclear body; nucleus; nucleoplasm
Biological process	anterior/posterior pattern specification; smoothened signaling pathway; regulation of cell cycle; transforming growth factor beta receptor signaling pathway; positive regulation of DNA binding; intrinsic apoptotic signaling pathway; transcription, DNA-templated; lens induction in camera-type eye; peptidyl-serine phosphorylation; embryonic camera-type eye morphogenesis; peptidyl-threonine phosphorylation; eye development; positive regulation of transforming growth factor beta receptor signaling pathway; positive regulation of DNA-binding transcription factor activity; DNA damage response, signal transduction by p53 class mediator resulting in transcription of p21 class mediator; voluntary musculoskeletal movement; SMAD protein signal transduction; intrinsic apoptotic signaling pathway in response to DNA damage by p53 class mediator; adult walking behavior; apoptotic process; adult locomotory behavior; protein phosphorylation; negative regulation of transcription by RNA polymerase II; iris morphogenesis; positive regulation of cell population proliferation; positive regulation of transcription, DNA-templated; cellular response to DNA damage stimulus; positive regulation of JNK cascade; PML body organization; negative regulation of neuron apoptotic process; positive regulation of angiogenesis; regulation of transcription, DNA-templated; embryonic retina morphogenesis in camera-type eye; modulation by virus of host process; retina layer formation; positive regulation of transcription by RNA polymerase II; neuron differentiation; positive regulation of protein binding; cellular response to hypoxia; positive regulation of protein phosphorylation; erythrocyte differentiation; negative regulation of BMP signaling pathway; phosphorylation; regulation of signal transduction by p53 class mediator; transcription by RNA polymerase II; negative regulation of ubiquitin-dependent protein catabolic process
Sources:Amigo / QuickGO
Orthologs
Databases	NCBI: entry; OMA: entry
Species	Human	Mouse
Entrez	28996	15258
Ensembl	ENSG00000064393	ENSMUSG00000061436
UniProt	Q9H2X6	Q9QZR5
RefSeq (mRNA)	NM_001113239; NM_022740	NM_001136065; NM_001294143; NM_001294144; NM_010433
RefSeq (protein)	NP_001106710; NP_073577	NP_001129537; NP_001281072; NP_001281073; NP_034563
Location (UCSC)	Chr 7: 139.56 – 139.78 Mb	Chr 6: 38.67 – 38.85 Mb
PubMed search
- Wikidata
View/Edit Human	View/Edit Mouse

Homeodomain-interacting protein kinase 2 is an enzyme that in humans is encoded by the HIPK2 gene. HIPK2 can be categorized as a Serine/Threonine Protein kinase, specifically one that interacts with homeodomain transcription factors. It belongs to a family of protein kinases known as the DYRK kinases. Within this family HIPK2 belongs to a group of homeodomain-interacting protein kinases (HIPKs), including HIPK1 and HIPK3. HIPK2 can be found in a wide variety of species and its functions in gene expression and apoptosis are regulated by several different mechanisms.

== Discovery ==
HIPK2 was discovered concurrently with HIPKs 1 and 3 in 1998. The HIPKs were discovered during an experiment that tried to identify genes that when expressed, yielded products that interacted with transcription factors related to the NK homeodomain . HIPKs were discovered using a technique called Two-hybrid screening. Two-hybrid screening is in conjunction with cDNA cloning, in which embryonic mouse cDNA libraries were used with mouse homeoprotein Nkx-1.2 to find genes involved with homeodomain transcription factors. The researchers found two clones that were similar in protein sequence, demonstrated a strong interaction with the homeoprotein, and an active site characteristic of protein kinases. These characteristics led to the name "HIPK". In 2000, the location of the HIPK2 gene was discovered to be on the long arm of Chromosome 7 (human) in the human genome. In mice, HIPK2 was discovered to be on Chromosome 6.

== Homology ==
There is evidence to suggest that HIPKs including HIPK2 are evolutionarily conserved proteins across a wide array of species. The human sequence shares a close similarity to a sequence from the genome of Caenorhabditis elegans. HIPKs also share a close similarity with YAK1 in yeast and are in the same family as a kinase from Dictyostelium. Furthermore, HIPKs are able to interact with homeoproteins from other species, such as NK-1 and NK-3 in Drosophila as well as Nkx-2.5 in mice. HIPK2 can also be found in dogs, cats, sheep, and zebrafish as well as many other species.

== Localization ==
=== Expression in tissues ===
HIPK2 is expressed in nearly all tissue types, however it is highly expressed in the heart, muscle and kidneys. HIPK2 has been shown to be expressed at the highest levels in the brain and neuronal tissues. In addition to adult tissues, HIPK2 is also expressed late in the development of the Human embryo, specifically in the retina, muscles, and neural tissues.

=== Sub-cellular localization ===
HIPK2 is found in the nucleus within structures called nuclear speckles. It is also associated with PML bodies, which are also structures found in the nucleus. Despite being found predominately in the nucleus, HIPK2 can also be Cytoplasmic.

== Structure ==
=== Gene ===
The HIPK2 gene contains 13 exons and 13 introns within the entire 59.1 Kilo-base pair sequence. Along with the other HIPKs, it contains three conserved sequences: a protein kinase domain, an interaction domain, a PEST sequence, and a YH domain. Alternative splicing produces three different messenger RNAs, which subsequently lead to the production of three Protein isoforms.

=== Protein ===
The HIPK2 protein is 1198 amino acids in length and has a molecular weight of 130.97 kilodaltons. The most abundant amino acids in the protein are serine, threonine and alanine, which make up approximately 30 percent of the proteins total amino acid count. The structure of the protein in its native form is unstable. The protein is made up of several regions which directly relate to its function, regulation, and localization. The protein kinase domain is 330 amino acids long and is located near the N-terminus of the protein. In addition to its kinase domain, HIPK2 has two nuclear localization signals, a SUMO interaction motif, an auto-inhibitory domain a transcriptional co-repression domain, and several interaction domains, including one for p53. While there are signals targeting HIPK2 to nuclear speckles, there is also a speckle retention sequence that causes HIPK2 to remain in the nuclear speckles. The auto-inhibitory domain, which contains an ubiquitylation site at the K1182 residue is located at the C-terminus.

== Function ==
HIPK2 has two major functions. It acts as a co-repressor for NK homeodomain transcription factors, increasing their DNA binding affinity and their repressive effect on transcription. HIPK2 participates in the regulation of gene expression through its contribution to regulating homeobox genes. These genes encode transcription factors that act to regulate target genes. HIPK2 also acts in signal transduction, specifically the pathway leading to programmed cell death (apoptosis). HIPK2 can promote apoptosis either in association with p53 or by a separate mechanism. HIPK2 phosphorylates the S46 residue of p53, leading to its activation, which in turn leads to the transcription of factors that induce apoptosis. Phosphorylation of p53 by HIPK2 prevents the association of negative regulator Mdm2 to p53 and is necessary for the acetylation of the K382 residue in p53, which also serves as a functionally important modification. Proper folding of p53 is essential for p53 function. The folding of p53 depends on the presence of zinc, and HIPK2 plays a role in zinc regulation. Consequently, the absence of HIPK2 leads to p53 misfolding. HIPK2 indirectly enhances p53 activity by phosphorylating negative regulators of p53, such as CtBP1 and Mdm2, leading to their degradation by the proteasome. HIPK2 also has the ability to regulate cellular response to reactive oxygen species by regulating the expression of both oxidant and antioxidant genes.

== Regulation ==
HIPK2 is regulated by other proteins, as well as cellular conditions and post-translational modifications.

=== Positive ===
Under conditions of DNA damage, HIPK2 is stabilized and subject to positive regulation. The activity of HIPK2 is increased through the action of caspase 6. Caspase 6 cleaves HIPK2 at residue D916 and D977. As a result, the auto-inhibitory domain is removed and the activity of HIPK2 increases. HIPK2 activity can also be increased through the action of checkpoint kinases. These kinases phosphorylate HIPK2 associated ubiquitin ligases and prevent their binding to HIPK2. As a result, the degradation of HIPK2 through the ubiquitin proteasome pathway is inhibited. In conditions of oxidative stress, sumoylation of HIPK2 prevents acetylation, and as a result maintains its function in facilitating apoptosis. Under normal physiological conditions however, acetylation of HIPK2 by a protein called p300 again stabilizes HIPK2 but, increases its ability to induce apoptosis. Phosphorylation of HIPK2 at residues T880 and S882, via another kinase or through auto-phosphorylation, leads to the recruitment of PIN1 and stabilization of HIPK2. This results in increased apoptotic function of HIPK2.

=== Negative ===
Under regular conditions HIPK2 is unstable and is subject to negative regulation. HIPK2 is subject to regulation by the ubiquitin proteasome pathway, in which ubiquitin ligases bind to HIPK2, leading to polyubiquitination at the K1182 residue, localization to the proteasome and subsequent degradation of the protein. leads to protein degradation. The PEST sequence found in HIPK2 is also linked to protein degradation. HIPK2 activity can also be down regulated by the protein HMGA1, which transports it back to the cytoplasm. In conditions of oxidative stress sumoylation of HIPK2 is discouraged and acetylation is promoted, resulting in its stabilization and the inhibition of its ability to facilitate apoptosis.

=== P53 ===
p53 regulates HIPK2 using both positive and negative mechanisms. p53 binds to the third intron of the caspase 6 gene, and promotes the activation of the gene. Caspase 6 in turn activates HIPK2. Conversely, p53 down regulates HIPK2 by activating the ubiquitin ligase mdm2. An interaction of mdm2 and HIPK2 leads to the ubiquitination and eventual degradation of HIPK2.

== Mutations ==
Two mutations have been discovered in the speckle retention sequence, both of which are missense. One of which was named R868W, meaning that at residue 868 where the wild type amino acid sequence would have contained an arginine residue, it now contains a tryptophan residue. The other mutation was named N958I, meaning that at residue 958 where the wild type amino acid sequence would have contained an asparagine residue, it now contains an isoleucine residue. The R868W mutation is the result of cytosine to thymine point mutation and the N985I mutation resulted from an adenine to thymine point mutation. The R868W mutation was found in exon 12 and the N985I mutation was found in exon 13. These mutations lead to forms of HIPK2 that are less active and show abhorrent localization to nuclear speckles. The speckle retention sequence is necessary for HIPK2 function in transcription activation as deletion of this sequence inhibits the function.

== Interactions ==
HIPK2 interacts with several other proteins:

- CREB binding protein
- p53
- p300
- SKI protein
- TP53INP1
- ATM kinase
- PIN1
- HMGA1
- SIAH1
- WSB1
- caspase 6
- Tachykinin receptor 3
- Mdm2
- CtBP

== Clinical significance ==
Improper HIPK2 function has been implicated in the pathology of diseases such as acute myeloid leukemia, myelodysplastic syndrome through mutations in the speckle retention sequence and Alzheimer's disease through hyperdegradation of HIPK2. Consistent with its tissue expression patterns, loss of HIPK2 function has also been implicated in kidney fibrosis and cardiovascular disease.
