= Targeted lentiviral delivery for in vivo CAR T-cell generation =

Experimental lentiviral approach to generating CAR-T cells inside the body

Targeted lentiviral delivery for in vivo CAR-T cell generation is an experimental approach to CAR-T cell therapy in which retargeted lentiviral vectors deliver a chimeric antigen receptor (CAR) transgene directly to endogenous T cells in the body, rather than modifying cells ex vivo and reinfusing them.

== Background ==
Conventional autologous CAR-T therapy generally involves leukapheresis, ex vivo gene transfer, cell expansion, and reinfusion after chemotherapy-based lymphodepletion. Although clinically effective in several hematologic malignancies, this manufacturing model is associated with complex logistics, limited production capacity, high cost, and variability in the fitness of the final T-cell product.

== Mechanism ==
Conventional ex vivo lentiviral CAR-T manufacture commonly relies on broadly tropic pseudotypes such as vesicular stomatitis virus glycoprotein (VSV-G). For systemic in vivo use, however, vectors must be retargeted to reduce non-specific uptake and off-target transduction.

Experimental systems described in reviews include modified Nipah virus glycoproteins, de-targeted VSV-G variants bearing anti-CD3 single-chain variable fragments (scFvs), and cocal glycoprotein-based platforms. CD3, CD4, and CD8-directed targeting strategies have all been reported in preclinical or early translational work.

After intravenous administration, the vector is intended to bind and transduce circulating T cells, which then express the CAR protein and may expand after antigen encounter, producing an antitumor response without ex vivo cell manufacture.

== Relation to other in vivo CAR-T approaches ==
Targeted lentiviral delivery is one of several approaches to in vivo CAR-T generation. Other approaches use lipid nanoparticle or polymer-based systems to deliver RNA or DNA cargo. Lentiviral vectors differ in that they can support stable genomic integration and potentially sustained CAR expression, but that same feature also raises vector-specific genotoxicity questions.

== Proposed advantages ==
Reviews have proposed several potential advantages over conventional autologous manufacturing, including the possibility of batch-made "off-the-shelf" vector products, shorter time to treatment, less dependence on centralized clean-room manufacturing, and avoidance of prolonged ex vivo manipulation.

Shorter or absent ex vivo culture may also help preserve less differentiated T-cell states, whereas prolonged manufacture has been associated with more differentiated or exhausted phenotypes. Depending on the platform, in vivo generation may also reduce or avoid the lymphodepleting chemotherapy typically used before infusion of ex vivo CAR-T products.

== Clinical development ==
Preclinical proof of concept has been reported in mouse models and non-human primates, and reviews published in the mid-2020s described several company and academic platforms in development, including Umoja Biopharma's VivoVec and Kelonia Therapeutics' in vivo gene placement system (iGPS).

As of 2026, phase 1 studies were listed for UB-VV111 in relapsed or refractory CD19-positive B-cell malignancies and KLN-1010 in relapsed or refractory multiple myeloma. Clinical programs have mainly focused on targets that were already validated in conventional CAR-T therapy, including CD19 and BCMA.

The field has also attracted large-pharmaceutical interest. In April 2026, Eli Lilly agreed to acquire Kelonia Therapeutics, whose lead program was KLN-1010.

== Safety and challenges ==
The main challenges identified in reviews are targeting specificity, control of in vivo pharmacology, and long-term safety. If transduction is not sufficiently selective, non-target cells may be co-engineered, reducing efficacy or causing organ immunopathology.

Because lentiviral vectors can integrate into the host genome, targeted lentiviral delivery also carries a theoretical risk of insertional mutagenesis and requires long-term monitoring; modern platforms generally use self-inactivating, replication-incompetent vector designs to mitigate this risk.

Immunogenicity against viral components may limit transduction efficiency or repeated dosing, and successful in vivo generation of CAR-T cells may still produce familiar CAR-T toxicities such as cytokine release syndrome (CRS) and immune effector cell-associated neurotoxicity syndrome (ICANS).

A further theoretical concern, by analogy to rare reports from ex vivo CAR-T manufacturing, is epitope masking after inadvertent tumor-cell transduction.

== See also ==
- CAR T cell
- Engineered CAR T cell delivery
- Viral vector
- Gene therapy
- Cancer immunotherapy
