= Engineered CAR T cell delivery =

Delivery methods of CAR-T cells

Engineered chimeric antigen receptor (CAR)-T cell delivery is the methodology by which clinicians introduce the cancer-targeting therapeutic system of the CAR-T cell to the human body. CAR-T cells, which utilizes genetic modification of human T-cells to contain antigen binding sequences in addition to the receptor systems CD4 or CD8, are useful in direct targeting and elimination of cancer cells through cytotoxicity.

CAR-T cell delivery involves many varying modalities for implementation, spurring innovative biomedical research to address these modalities. These delivery mechanisms serve to address the limitations of CAR-T cells in translational experimentation and clinical trials, including shelf-life, off-target effects, and tumor infiltration. As of April 2023, six CAR-T cell therapies are clinically approved by the FDA, all of which target hematologic (blood-based) cancers, including multiple myeloma and B-cell leukemias. Novel engineered compound-based delivery methods, some of which are in clinical trials, aim to address limitations related to CAR-T cell delivery with the focus to target non-blood based cancers.

== Systemic and intravenous delivery ==
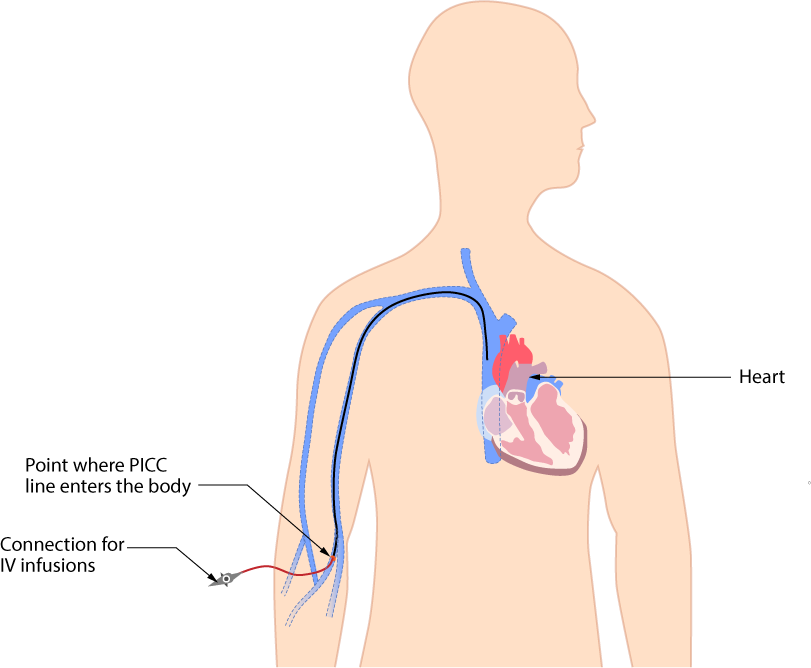
Central line insertion of catheter. This is the most common method of infusion of CAR-T cells to systemic circulation after ex-vivo manufacturing.

The classic method of administration of CAR-T cells to cancers within the human body is through intravenous (IV) central line infusion. This infusion allows the CAR-T cells to enter the body's cardiovascular system, entering the circulation (systemically) amongst developing hematologic cancers. This facilitates the final step in generation and implementation of both autologous and allogeneic CAR-T cell therapy. While this delivery method is reliable for hematologic cancers, as demonstrated by successful clinical trials and FDA regulation, systemic delivery may result in an increase in autoimmune overload, leading to toxic disorders such as cytokine release syndrome (CRS). Discrimination between healthy and malignant cancer cells may additionally result in aplasia, or extremely low or absent amounts of healthy blood cells. Thus, clinically recommended dosage amounts are in place for current CAR-T cell therapies. Current methods exploring ways to improve such complications have been introduced recently by researchers, including "off-switches" to turn off CAR-T cells after initial therapies and further genetic modification to avoid immune rejection. While systemic delivery is important for targeting hematologic cancers, it remains inefficient at targeting solid, or non-circulatory, cancerous tumors. Therefore, regional, or localized targeting strategies utilizing CAR-T cells have arisen in pre-clinical research.

== Localized delivery mechanisms ==
Solid tumors, which typically take the form of neoplasms in epithelial cells or in bones, tissue, or adipose (fat), are different than hematologic cancers in that they form a mass of cells, thereby maintaining multiple layers of protection. Because CAR-T cells attack cancerous cells at a surface level, this leaves the CAR-T cells vulnerable to cancerous cell resistance, which renders the CAR-T cell inefficient. In recent years, cellular and genetic engineering methods have been explored by researchers to overcome layered protection of solid tumors, in addition to other challenges that have been presented in the advent of CAR-T cell delivery such as in-situ editing and manufacturing, negative immune responses, and biocompatibility of delivery structures. Some of the methodologies used to suspend and deliver CAR-T cells include hydrogel and polymeric gel-based delivery systems, thin polymeric films, and microneedle patches. Most of these devices, currently still in the pre-clinical phase, are intended to be injected or surgically inserted directly into the solid tumor mass. While initial clinical trials have been unsuccessful due to relatively inefficient delivery as compared to direct injection and high immunosuppression, recent research has shown promise in overcoming these barriers.

=== Gel-based delivery ===
Gel-based delivery of CAR-T cells involves implantation or injection of a hydrogel or polymer gel into the target solid tumor. These gels suspend CAR-T cells in various ways through manipulation of cell-specific chemistry or by fixing the cells in a polymeric matrix. One strength of gel-based delivery is that these systems are functionally biodegradable, so once the CAR-T cells have been administered, the depot does not stay in the body, reducing immunosuppressive conditions or tumor resistance.

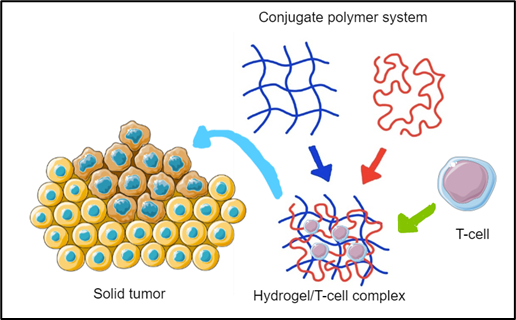
Cartoon example of a hydrogel-based lymphocyte complex. Multiple polymers including fibrinogen and thrombin can join to form a scaffold that can contain lymphocytes to deliver to solid tumors.

One of the earliest examples of this methodology developed by Luo et al. in 2020 consisted of a layered hydrogel microchip that facilitated CAR-T survival from immunosuppressive elements of the tumor system which could be injected into the tumor. In addition, this system was able to take advantage of the hypoxic (low oxygen) conditions of the tumor by additionally containing oxygen-releasing agents that when released with interleukin-15 (IL-15) cytokines could cause tumor cell death.

Two recent examples utilizing gel-based delivery towards specific cancers include targeted fibrin gel-based delivery to glioblastoma and modified CAR-T cell hydrogel complexes to retinoblastoma. In the glioblastoma-targeting system, Ogunnaike et al. used CAR-T cells loaded in a fibrin matrix, which undergoes in-situ polymerization upon mixture of fibrinogen and thrombin (as part of the coagulation cascade). In addition, the CAR-T cells were modified to target the B7-H3 antigen, present on some forms of cancer including glioblastoma. In the retinoblastoma-targeting system, Wang et al. fabricated CAR-T cells specific to the GD2 ganglioside, specific to retinoblastoma, and suspended them into an IL-15/chitosan-polyethylene glycol (PEG) hydrogel suspension, effectively targeting the tumor via injection.

Additionally, researchers have developed hydrogel-based systems that limit further growth and proliferation of tumors, such as the hyaluronic acid hydrogel system developed by Hu et al. This system, which targets melanoma through targeting the CSPG4 antigen, was shown to slowly but efficiently release IL-15 and CAR-T cells from a cross-linked hyaluronic acid matrix and poly(lactic-co-glycolic acid) (PLGA) nanoparticle suspension intratumorally. In addition, the system utilized anti-PDL1 antibody delivery, increasing platelet release of programmed cell death molecules onto the tumors, killing them.

Sustained delivery and long-term retention of CAR-T cells through hydrogel systems has also been developed, as shown by Grosskopf et al., to address controlled release of CAR-T cells onto tumors. In this system, the researchers crosslinked a combination of dodecyl-modified hydroxypropyl methylcellulose (HPMC-C12) and PEG-poly(lactic acid) (PLA) nanoparticles to form the hydrogel, then mixed CAR-T cells and IL-15 into the matrix. The sustained release profiles showed promise in tumor suppression treatments due to the slow release duration profiles.

Codelivery of CAR-T cells with other agonists, such as stimulator of interferon (IFN) genes (STING), remain a popular new method of administration of CAR-T cells to solid tumors. Smith et al. developed a silica nanoparticle based coating conjugated with lipid film to suspend CAR-T cells and select antibodies onto an alginate polymer scaffold. This system was tested in mouse pancreatic cancer and melanoma models, and showed expansion of CAR-T cells at the tumor site, increasing the therapeutic efficiency.

There are still challenges with these delivery systems, however, as they have limitations on CAR-T cell suspension amounts, host-specific immunogenic responses, and have been performed primarily in mouse models. Regardless, hydrogel-based CAR-T delivery systems have shown promise in translational experimentations towards solid tumor targeting.

=== Thin Film Delivery ===
Thin-film targeting has emerged as an alternative method of CAR-T cell delivery to solid tumors, utilizing metal-based microfilms made of nitinol, an alloy of nickel and titanium, a composite commonly used in stents. One such example using these nitinol scaffolds was developed by Coon et al., whereby the researchers suspended CAR-T cells into pores laden throughout the film, combined with fibrin.

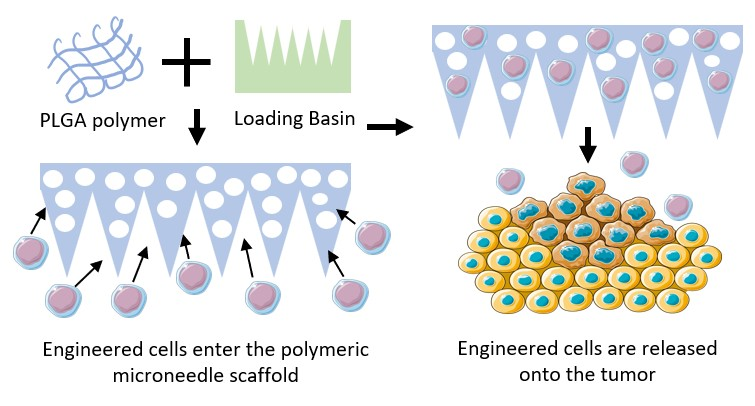
The formulation, loading, and delivery of engineered T-cells using a PLGA-based polymeric microneedle matrix onto a solid tumor.

Upon implantation, the CAR-T cells would release from the film, but remain within the site of the tumor due to engineered antibody attraction of the film. This caused increased localization and duration of CAR-T therapy to the tumor site as compared to intravenous or local injection of CAR-T cells.

=== Microneedle Delivery ===
Microneedle patches have been used previously as a minimally-invasive, distributive system to release drugs across certain body systems, most notably on the skin. Microneedles patches have been used recently as a method of CAR-T cell release to solid tumor cancers such as melanoma and pancreatic cancer. Using a porous PLGA microneedle-shaped scaffold, Li et al. developed a system to suspend and release CAR-T cells. An advantage of this method is that the patch could be inserted on the surface of the tumor, allowing for surface-targeting of CAR-T cells upon release. Additionally, the needles would penetrate into the solid tumor, allowing for a distribution of CAR-T cells release along the interior axis of the tumor.

== In-situ generation of CAR-T cells ==
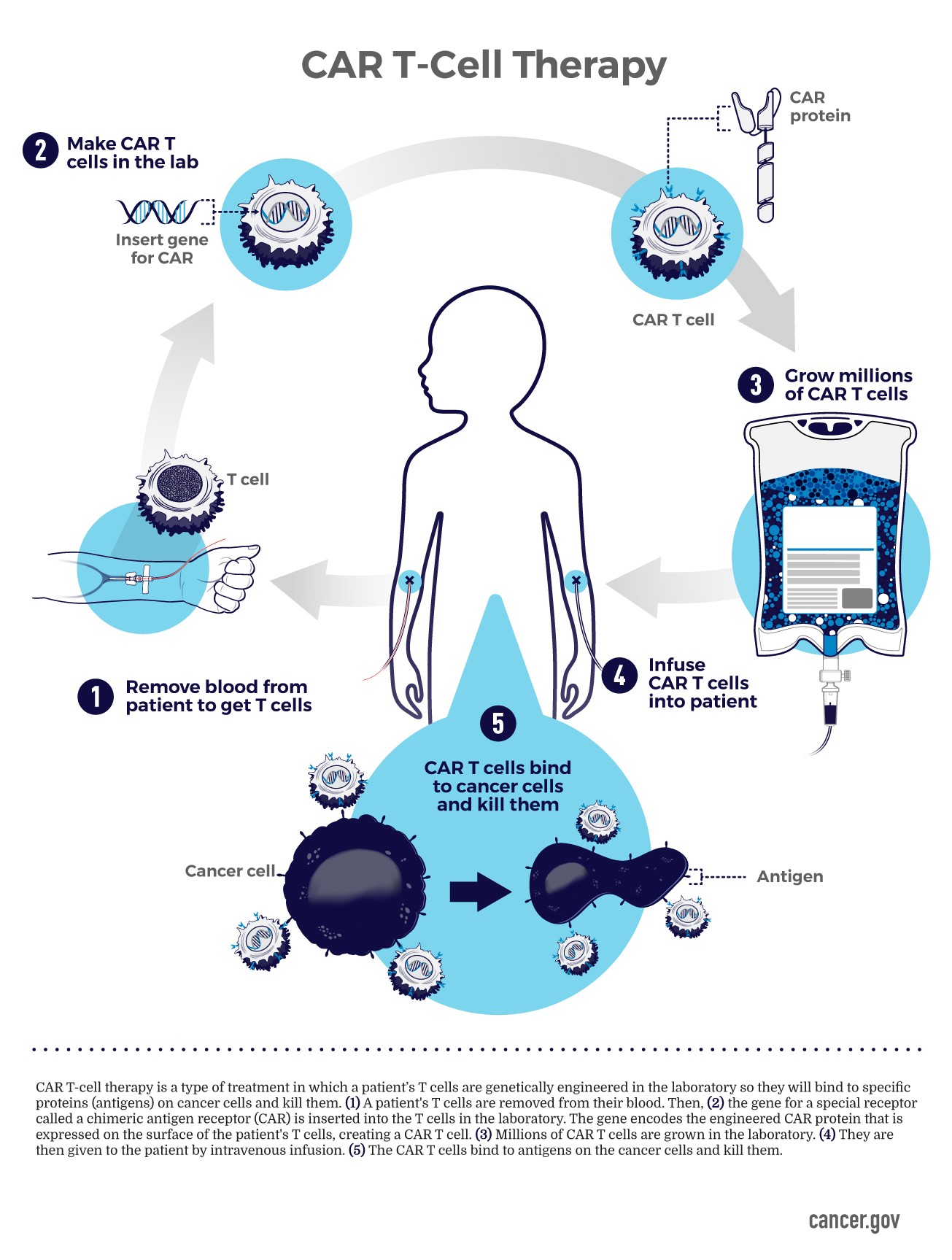
Diagram from the National Cancer Institute (NCI) depicting the classical method of constructing a CAR-T cell for therapy.

Production of CAR-T cells involve removal of T cells via an extraction process known as leukapheresis, followed by cell culture with viral vectors containing ingredients needed to construct the chimeric system. These methodologies, while important, have been shown to be expensive and time-consuming. Recent advances in research have introduced "scaffold factories" to program, produce, and release autologous CAR-T cells into the body after implantation. These "scaffold factories" have shown to function in targeting hematologic cancers and show promise in future research to target solid tumors.

One method of in-situ generation involves the injection of lentiviral vectors, containing genetic information relating to targeting of CD4 antigens directly to lymphocytes in conjugation with the CAR gene, allowing for the construction of this system within the body, as shown by Agarwal et al. Another method of in-situ generation involves the manufacture polymeric nanocarriers to carry genes involved in the development of the CAR-T cell. Smith et al. used poly(β-amino ester) (PBAE) particles laden with polyglutamic acid (PGA), nuclear localization signals, and T-cell targeting fragments to deliver CAR genes to T cells for translation into CAR-T cells.

These advances have led to the investigation and development of a novel system for manufacturing CAR-T cells known as Multifunctional Alginate Scaffold for T Cell Engineering and Release (MASTER). These alginate scaffolds, which are highly porous, are embedded with azide, cyclooctyne-conjugated targeting antibodies, CAR-based retroviral vectors, and mononuclear blood cells. The azide and cyclooctyne-conjugated particles undergo a rapid click chemistry reaction, whereby when implanted, alongside introduction of the blood cells, the scaffold will generate CAR-T cells. This system was shown to be long-lasting and biodegradable, factors that are important for long suppression of cancers.

== See also ==
- CAR T cell
- Cellular adoptive immunotherapy
- Cancer immunotherapy
- Bioinstructive material
- Cell encapsulation
- Gene therapy for blood diseases
