= CD276 =

Protein found in humans

Identifiers
- Aliases: CD276, 4Ig-B7-H3, B7-H3, B7H3, B7RP-2, CD276 molecule
- External IDs: OMIM: 605715; MGI: 2183926; GeneCards: CD276
Available structures
PDB	Ortholog search: PDBe RCSB
PDB	List of PDB id codes 4I0K

Gene location (Human)
Chr.	Chromosome 15 (human)
Band	15q24.1	Start	73,683,966 bp
Band	15q24.1	End	73,714,514 bp

Gene location (Mouse)
Chr.	Chromosome 9 (mouse)
Band	9|9 B	Start	58,431,581 bp
Band	9|9 B	End	58,462,720 bp
RNA expression pattern
Bgee	Human / Mouse (ortholog); Top expressed in: stromal cell of endometrium; ganglionic eminence; ventricular zone; gallbladder; canal of the cervix; right adrenal cortex; left adrenal gland; apex of heart; left adrenal cortex; islet of Langerhans / Top expressed in: tail of embryo; external carotid artery; internal carotid artery; genital tubercle; calvaria; epiblast; Gonadal ridge; molar; ventricular zone; embryo; More reference expression data
BioGPS	n/a
Gene ontology
Molecular function	protein binding; signaling receptor binding
Cellular component	membrane; integral component of membrane; external side of plasma membrane
Biological process	cell population proliferation; T cell activation; immune response; positive regulation of T cell proliferation; regulation of immune response; T cell receptor signaling pathway
Sources:Amigo / QuickGO
Orthologs
Databases	NCBI: entry; OMA: entry
Species	Human	Mouse
Entrez	80381	102657
Ensembl	ENSG00000103855	ENSMUSG00000035914
UniProt	Q5ZPR3	Q8VE98
RefSeq (mRNA)	NM_001024736; NM_025240; NM_001329628; NM_001329629	NM_133983
RefSeq (protein)	NP_001019907; NP_001316557; NP_001316558; NP_079516	NP_598744
Location (UCSC)	Chr 15: 73.68 – 73.71 Mb	Chr 9: 58.43 – 58.46 Mb
PubMed search
- Wikidata
View/Edit Human	View/Edit Mouse

Cluster of Differentiation 276 (CD276) or B7 Homolog 3 (B7-H3) is a human protein encoded by the CD276 gene.

== Structure ==
B7-H3 is a 316 amino acid-long type I transmembrane protein, existing in two isoforms determined by its extracellular domain. In mice, the extracellular domain consists of a single pair of immunoglobulin variable (IgV)-like and immunoglobulin constant (IgC)-like domains, whereas in humans it consists of one pair (2Ig-B7-H3) or two identical pairs (4Ig-B7-H3) due to exon duplication. B7-H3 mRNA is expressed in most normal tissues. In contrast, B7-H3 protein has a very limited expression on normal tissues because of its post-transcriptional regulation by microRNAs. However, B7-H3 protein is expressed at high frequency on many different cancer types (60% of all cancers). The 4Ig-B7-H3 isoform is predominant in cancer.

== Function ==
In non-malignant tissues, B7-H3 has a predominantly inhibitory role in adaptive immunity, suppressing T cell activation and proliferation.

In malignant tissues, B7-H3 is an immune checkpoint molecule that inhibits tumor antigen-specific immune responses. B7-H3 also possesses non-immunological pro-tumorigenic functions such as promoting migration, invasion, angiogenesis, chemoresistance, epithelial-to-mesenchymal transition, and affecting tumor cell metabolism.

=== As a possible drug target ===
Due to its selective expression on solid tumors, B7-H3 has been the target of several anticancer agents such as enoblituzumab (MGA271), omburtamab, MGD009, MGC018, DS-7300a, and CAR T cells. Nanobodies targeting the IgV and IgC domains of B7-H3 have been developed in the laboratory of Mitchell Ho at the NCI, NIH (Bethesda, US). The nanobody-based CAR T cells are active in preclinical models of pancreatic cancer and neuroblastoma and show efficacy against large tumors in mice.

== See also ==
- Cluster of differentiation
