= Enoblituzumab =

Monoclonal antibody

Monoclonal antibody
- Type: ?
- Source: Humanized (from mouse)
- Target: B7-H3

Clinical data
- Other names: MGA271
- ATC code: none

Identifiers
- CAS Number: 1353485-38-7
- ChemSpider: none
- UNII: M6030H73N9
- KEGG: D11752

Chemical and physical data
- Formula: C_{6474}H_{9990}N_{1726}O_{2030}S_{42}
- Molar mass: 145829.71 g·mol^{−1}

Enoblituzumab is a monoclonal antibody designed for the treatment of cancer. Formerly known as MGA271, the drug is a humanized IgG1κ monoclonal antibody recognizing human B7-H3, a member of the B7 family of immune regulators.

This drug was developed by MacroGenics, Inc.
