= TP53INP1 =

Protein-coding gene in the species Homo sapiens

Identifiers
- Aliases: TP53INP1, SIP, TP53DINP1, TP53INP1A, TP53INP1B, Teap, p53DINP1, tumor protein p53 inducible nuclear protein 1
- External IDs: OMIM: 606185; MGI: 1926609; HomoloGene: 11065; GeneCards: TP53INP1; OMA:TP53INP1 - orthologs

Gene location (Human)
Chr.	Chromosome 8 (human)
Band	8q22.1	Start	94,925,972 bp
Band	8q22.1	End	94,949,378 bp

Gene location (Mouse)
Chr.	Chromosome 4 (mouse)
Band	4|4 A1	Start	11,156,431 bp
Band	4|4 A1	End	11,174,379 bp
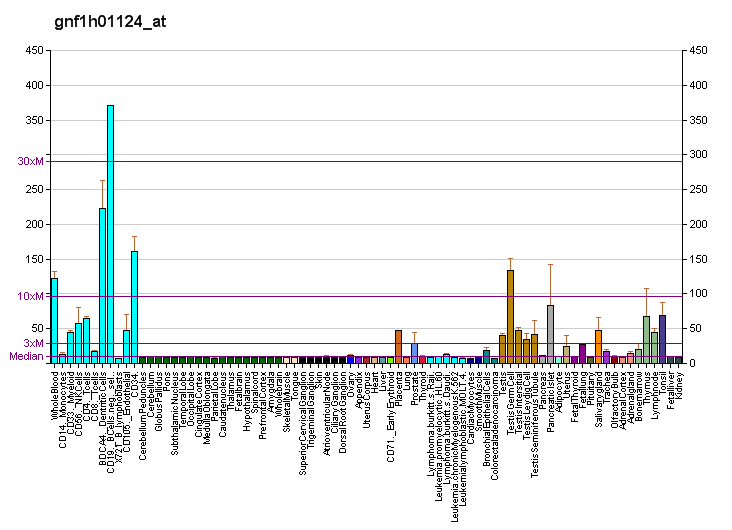
RNA expression pattern
Bgee	Human / Mouse (ortholog); Top expressed in: sperm; epithelium of nasopharynx; thymus; bronchial epithelial cell; mucosa of ileum; body of pancreas; visceral pleura; parietal pleura; germinal epithelium; palpebral conjunctiva / Top expressed in: stroma of bone marrow; lymph node; thymus; mesenteric lymph nodes; Paneth cell; vestibular membrane of cochlear duct; ascending aorta; utricle; blood; pituitary gland; More reference expression data
BioGPS	More reference expression data
Gene ontology
Molecular function	antioxidant activity; protein binding
Cellular component	cytosol; PML body; autophagosome; cytoplasmic vesicle; nucleus; nucleoplasm; cytoplasm
Biological process	regulation of transcription, DNA-templated; cellular response to ethanol; positive regulation of autophagy; cellular response to methyl methanesulfonate; cellular response to UV; cellular oxidant detoxification; positive regulation of apoptotic signaling pathway; response to heat; autophagosome assembly; transcription, DNA-templated; cellular response to hydroperoxide; positive regulation of transcription, DNA-templated; autophagy; negative regulation of cell migration; regulation of autophagy; positive regulation of apoptotic process; autophagic cell death; negative regulation of cell population proliferation; apoptotic process; regulation of apoptotic process; regulation of signal transduction by p53 class mediator; positive regulation of gene expression; negative regulation of gene expression; negative regulation of fibroblast proliferation; negative regulation of myofibroblast differentiation
Sources:Amigo / QuickGO
Orthologs
Species	Human	Mouse
Entrez	94241	60599
Ensembl	ENSG00000164938	ENSMUSG00000028211
UniProt	Q96A56	Q9QXE4
RefSeq (mRNA)	NM_001135733; NM_033285	NM_001199105; NM_021897
RefSeq (protein)	NP_001129205; NP_150601	NP_001186034; NP_068697
Location (UCSC)	Chr 8: 94.93 – 94.95 Mb	Chr 4: 11.16 – 11.17 Mb
PubMed search
- Wikidata
View/Edit Human	View/Edit Mouse

Tumor protein p53-inducible nuclear protein 1 is a protein that in humans is encoded by the TP53INP1 gene. In mice this protein is also called TRP53INP1 and is encoded by the Trp53inp1 gene. The protein is also referred to as SIP or "stress inducible protein".

== Interactions ==
TP53INP1 has been shown to interact with HIPK2 and p53.
