= Bioinstructive material =

Bioinstructive materials provide instruction to biological cells or tissue, for example immune instruction when monocytes are cultured on certain polymers they polarise to pro- or anti-inflammatory macrophages with potential applications in implanted devices, or materials for the repair of musculoskeletal tissues. Due to the paucity of information on the mechanism of materials control of cells, beyond the general recognition of the important role of adsorbed biomolecules, high throughput screening of large libraries of materials, topographies, and shapes are often used to identify cell instructive material systems. Applications of bioinstructive materials as substrates for stem cell production, cell delivery and reduction of foreign body reaction, acceleration of wound healing and coatings to reduce infections on medical devices. This non-leaching approach is distinct from strategies of infection control relying on antibiotic release, cytokine delivery or guidance of cells by surface located epitopes inspired by nature.

== Multifunctional alginate scaffolds for T cell engineering and release ==
An example of bioinstructive scaffolds utilized is the Multifunctional alginate scaffolds for T cell engineering and release (MASTER). MASTER is a technique for in situ engineering, replication and release of genetically engineered T cells. It is an evolution of CAR-T cell therapy. T cells are extracted from the patient and mixed with a genetically engineered virus that contains a cancer targeting gene (as with CAR T). The mixture is then added to a MASTER (scaffold), which absorbs them. The MASTER contains antibodies that activate the T cells and interleukins that trigger cell proliferation. The MASTER is then implanted into the patient. The activated T cells interact with the viruses to become CAR T cells. The interleukins stimulate these CAR T cells to proliferate, and the CAR T cells exit the MASTER to attack the cancer. The technique takes hours instead of weeks. And because the cells are younger, they last longer in the body, show stronger potency against cancer, and display fewer markers of exhaustion. These features were demonstrated in mouse models. The treatment was more effective and longer lasting against lymphoma.
