= CDR1-AS =

Non-coding RNA in humans

Identifiers
- Aliases: CDR1-AS, CDR1NAT, CDR1as, ciRS-7, CDR1 antisense RNA, CIRS7
- External IDs: GeneCards: CDR1-AS; OMA:CDR1-AS - orthologs
Orthologs
Species	Human	Mouse
Entrez	103611090	n/a
Ensembl	n/a	n/a
UniProt	n a	n/a
RefSeq (mRNA)	n/a	n/a
RefSeq (protein)	n/a	n/a
Location (UCSC)	n/a	n/a
PubMed search		n/a
- Wikidata
View/Edit Human

CDR1 antisense RNA is an circular RNA that in humans is encoded by the CDR1-AS gene.
