= Cytokine delivery systems =

Methods of cytokine delivery

Cytokines are polypeptides or glycoproteins that help immune cells communicate to each other to induce proliferation, activation, differentiation, and inflammatory or anti-inflammatory signals in various cell types. Studies utilizing cytokines for antitumor therapies has increased significantly since 2000, and different cytokines provide unique antitumor activities. Cytokines hinder tumor cell development mostly through antiproliferative or proapoptotic pathways but can also interrupt development indirectly by eliciting immune cells to have cytotoxic effects against tumor cells. Even though there are FDA-approved cytokine therapies, there are two main challenges associated with cytokine delivery. The first is that cytokines have a short half-life, so frequent administration of high doses is required for therapeutic effect. The second is that systemic toxicity could occur if the cytokines delivered cause an intense immune response, known as a cytokine storm.

== Pegylated cytokines ==
Pegylation is the process of covalently binding polyethylene glycol (PEG) to proteins. Pegylation prolongs the half-life of the bound protein, leading to sustained delivery. This is advantageous because lower, less frequent dosing will be needed to have the same therapeutic effect in the patient, which will limit the cytotoxicity of the delivery system. Pegfilgrastim is a successful example of this delivery system. Pegfilgrastim is the pegylated form of the granulocyte-colony stimulating factor (G-CSF) filgrastim. Pegfilgrastim stimulates production and release of neutrophils in patients who experience bone marrow toxicity after receiving myelosuppressive anticancer drugs or radiation. Filgrastim has a half-life of 3-4 h, while Pegfilgrastim has a half-life of 45 h. This is much more convenient for patients, as they will only need one dose of Pegfilgrastim instead of multiple doses of Filgrastim drawn out over a long period. Ciliary neurotrophic factor (CNTF) is a cytokine used to combat diabetes symptoms such as appetite reduction and weight loss. A pegylated version of CNTF retained biological activity in vitro and had enhanced pharmacokinetics. The pegylated CNTF also reduced glycemia in diet-induced obese animals, with a dose 10-fold higher than unmodified CNTF. These studies demonstrate that pegylated cytokines can be used for sustained delivery of cytokines, increasing the therapeutic window of these treatments.

A major problem caused by pegylation is that the cytokine may change its molecular conformation, activity, and bioavailability upon PEG binding. Cytokines are advantageous due to their small sizes, which allow them to reach intracellular targets. PEG binding to cytokines could cause them to become too bulky to reach their specific targets, which should be taken into consideration when designing pegylated cytokines.

== GAG-based biomaterials ==
Glycosaminoglycans (GAGs) are naturally derived polysaccharides with distinct sequences of disaccharides. GAGs bind to cytokines and regulate cell recruitment, inflammation, and tissue remodeling by delivering cytokines to the extracellular matrix. Binding studies suggest GAGs have a natural affinity for cytokines, and cytokine binding to GAGs is mediated by nonspecific electrostatic interactions between positively charged domains on cytokines and negatively charged sulfate and carboxylic acid residues on GAGs. The GAG heparin has been explored extensively for cytokine delivery. Heparin-based hydrogels have shown to provide sustained delivery of IL-4 for more than 2 weeks, leading to a greater anti-inflammatory response than IL-4 alone. Another study utilized a starPEG-heparin hydrogel system to deliver vascular endothelial growth factor (VEGF) and fibroblast growth factor (FGF-2). The large concentration of heparin allowed loading and release of the cytokines to be independent of each other. The codelivery of the cytokines from the hydrogels led to pro-angiogenic effects both in vitro and in vivo, with the effect being much greater than administration of the single growth factors

== Immunocytokines ==
Antibody conjugation is another promising method for cytokine delivery. Antibody conjugation to cytokines can be used to improve site-specific delivery and prolong the cytokine half-life. Immunocytokines are delivered systemically but can specifically target the tumor through overexpressed or unique tumor antigens, cryptic extracellular matrix epitopes found only in tumors, or neovasculature markers indicating tumor angiogenesis. Cergutuzumab amunaleukin (CEA-IL2v) is an antibody-cytokine conjugate that links the cytokine IL-2 with an antibody targeting the carcinoembryonic antigen (CEA). This conjugate preferentially targets the tumor microenvironment to increase local delivery of IL-2 and minimize off-target toxicity. CEA-IL2v is ongoing phase I clinical trials in treating solid malignancies expressing CEA. Another immunocytokine is huBC1-IL12, which was developed to target the ED-B domain of fibronectin. This domain is overexpressed in tumor tissues but undetectable in almost all normal adult tissues. Systemic administration of huBC1-IL12 eliminated experimental PC3 metastases and suppressed the growth of multiple human tumor lines in immunocompromised mice more effectively than IL-12 alone. A Phase I trial studied the safety of weekly infusions of huBC1-IL12 in renal carcinoma and malignant melanoma patients. The maximum tolerated dose was found to be 15 ug/kg, which is 30 times higher than the maximum tolerated dose of IL-12 alone

Systemically administered immunocytokines are likely to significantly reduce cytokine-related cytotoxicity, but not eliminate it. Immunocytokines still interact with immune cells to induce signaling outside of the tumor, and there are problems with non-specific binding in non-target tissues that could disrupt regular immune functions in the body. Since immunocytokines are foreign to the body, they could also cause an immune reaction that produces anti-immunocytokine antibodies leading to pharmacological abrogation, therapeutic alteration, or hypersensitivity reactions.

== Nonviral nanoparticles ==
Nanoparticle delivery systems are popular due to their ability to encapsulate compounds without affecting bioactivity, and they exhibit controlled and sustained release of the encapsulated compounds to target tissues. Nanoparticles can be made of organic or inorganic agents and possess the ability to stabilize cytokines in vivo, enhance activity at the target site, improve aqueous solubility, and reduce systemic toxicity. Solvent, pH, temperature, charge, and size are many parameters that influence the encapsulation efficiency, nanoparticle toxicity, and cytokine stability. Cytokines can be encapsulated, adsorbed, or conjugated into nanoparticle systems for their delivery, and there are multiple nanoparticle systems that can be utilized for cytokine delivery

Polymeric nanoparticles are biocompatible, have low toxicity, and are biodegradable. They can be used to improve circulation times, stability, and encapsulation capacity compared to other nanoparticle systems. Polylactic-co-glycolic acid (PLGA) is the most popular polymer for nanoparticle delivery systems due to its simple synthesis using the oil-in-water method, high stability, easy encapsulation or adsorption of both hydrophobic and hydrophilic molecules, and easy surface modification. PLGA-PEG nanoparticles encapsulating IL-10 were created to prevent plaque formation in advanced atherosclerosis lesions. PLGA was charged at its terminal portions for better electrostatic interaction with IL-10 while PEG was used to functionalize the nanoparticle. These PLGA-PEG-IL-10 nanoparticles allowed for greater stability and prolonged systemic circulation of IL-10 and did not show any in vitro or in vivo cytotoxicity.

Liposomes are another type of nanoparticle delivery system widely studied. Liposomes can easily cross lipid bilayers and cell membranes but usually get rapidly eliminated in vivo unless stabilized with PEG or another polymer. Formation of liposomes can also present issues, as toxic solvents, high temperatures, and low pH can decrease the biosafety of the nanoparticles or denature the cytokine being delivered. Conjugating cytokines to liposomal surfaces is a useful approach because it allows cytokines to bind to their respective target cell receptors and allows multiple drugs to be delivered to potentiate the desired effect. Conjugating cytokines to the surface of lipids is typically done using the layer-by-layer technique which involves layering polymer materials to create a thin film that can regulate material properties of the carrier. Advantages of this nanoparticle design include multiple drug compartments for sequential cargo release, the ability to tailor surface chemistry with polymer layers to affect targeting and biodistribution, and improved pharmacokinetics. Rationally engineered layer-by-layer nanoparticles demonstrated high loading and release of active IL-12, localization of nanoparticles on the surface of tumor cells allowing IL-12 to be available to membrane receptors, and decreased systemic exposure. These layer-by-layer lipid nanoparticles significantly reduced IL-12 toxicity and demonstrated antitumor activity against colorectal and ovarian tumors at doses that were not tolerated with free IL-12 delivery

Gold nanoparticles are becoming increasingly popular as they exhibit high surface-to-volume ratio, they can easily travel to target cells, and they support high drug load. They can also easily be functionalized and synthesized. Gold-bound tumor necrosis factor (TNF) is in phase I trials for treatment of solid tumors. The trial found that gold-bound TNF has a tolerable dose that is three times higher than the tolerable dose for unmodified TNF. There was also higher drug concentration in the tumor tissue, indicating increased local delivery to the tumor microenvironment. Gold nanoparticles can elicit an immune response that hinders their efficacy, so it is important to evaluate cellular response such as cytokine production and reactive oxygen species production

Silica nanoparticles have also been evaluated for cytokine delivery due to their high colloidal stability, extensive surface functionalization, and possibility to control both structure and pore size. However, silica nanoparticles present limitations for cytokine delivery due to the low internalization efficiency for larger biomolecules. This challenge can be overcome by developing mesoporous silica nanoparticles with extra-large pores. These nanoparticles were used to deliver IL-4 to induce M2 macrophage polarization for anti-inflammatory and tissue homeostasis therapies. These nanoparticles increased IL-4 half-life, showed minimal toxicity, efficiently loaded and delivered IL-4, and stimulated M2 macrophage polarization

== Plasmid nanoparticles ==
Nucleic acids are much easier to produce, purify, and manipulate than recombinant cytokines and offer a method to deliver them locally and sustainably. Plasmid nanoparticles expressing cytokines coupled with electroporation is currently being explored for cytokine delivery. Electroporation temporarily increases the permeability of cell membranes without damaging the membrane structure. IL-12 is a cytokine known to have antitumor properties but shows severe dose-related toxicities in many patients. Intratumoral delivery of a plasmid encoding IL-12 followed by electroporation in a murine melanoma model resulted in a 47% cure rate. A phase II trial examined the safety and activity of plasmid encoding IL-12 followed by electroporation to treat stage III/IV unresectable melanoma. The median survival was 3.7 months with an objective overall response rate of 29.8%, including two complete responses. There were no grade IV events reported, and adverse events were rare

Other DNA complexes being evaluated to enhance cytokine delivery include lipoplexes, polyplexes, and lipopolyplexes, which are complexes of lipids, polymers, and lipids with polymers, respectively. Polyehtyleneimine (PEI) is a highly cationic polymer that complexes with negatively charged DNA. PEI protects DNA from degradation in vivo, promotes interaction with negatively charged cell membranes, and enhances release from lysosomes by acting as a proton sponge. PEI:IL-12 complexes were shown to transfect lung tissue following delivery via nebulization, leading to production of IL-12 in the lungs. Weekly or twice weekly administration of PEI:IL-12 was found to suppress or eliminate pulmonary metastases of SAOS-2 human osteosarcomas in athymic nude mice. In a different study, nanoparticles were created with a liposomal shell and two DNA encoding complementary sequences as the core. The liposomal shell was designed to be degraded by phospholipase A2 (PLA2), which is overexpressed by various tumors. The cytokine TRAIL was loaded onto the Ni^{2+} modified DNA cores. Upon interaction with PLA2, the DNA nanoparticles transformed into nanofibers to deliver TRAIL to death receptors on the cancer cell membrane. Delivery of TRAIL amplified apoptotic signaling with reduced TRAIL internalization to enhance antitumor efficacy

== Viral systems ==
Oncolytic viruses preferentially infect malignant cells, inducing immunogenic cell death. Oncolytic viruses include adenoviruses, Herpes simplex viruses, Semliki forest viruses, poxviruses, among others. They can be altered to optimize distribution and facilitate delivery to target tissues. Cytokine-loaded oncolytic viruses have shown activity in murine models, with several clinical trials under investigation. IMLYGIC (talimogene laherparepvec) was the first FDA-approved oncolytic virus for cancer treatment. It is a modified herpes simplex virus-1 expressing granulocyte-macrophage colony-stimulating factor (GM-CSF) for recurrent melanoma. It is currently being studied for soft-tissue sarcoma and liver cancer and for combination with immunotherapies. Adenoviruses are widely studied for cytokine delivery. In preclinical trials, intratumoral injections of adenoviruses encoding IL-12 (Ad-IL-12) mediated regression of murine colorectal carcinomas, breast carcinomas, prostate carcinomas, gliomas, bladder carcinomas, fibrosarcomas, laryngeal squamous cell carcinoma, hepatomas and hepatocellular carcinomas, medullary thyroid carcinomas, thyroid follicular cancer, and Ewing's sarcoma. The antitumor immune response of Ad-IL-12 is primarily mediated by CD8+ T cells.

There are many limitations associated with virus-based delivery systems. Anti-viral antibodies could be produced against viral cytokine delivery systems leading to delayed-type hypersensitivity responses, which may prevent repeated dosing. There is also a large disparity in the susceptibility patients have to viral infections since viral delivery of cytokines requires transfection of host cells, which is highly variable from patient to patient. There has also been significant off-target transgene expression seen in clinical trials. Small volumes of intratumoral injection of adenoviruses were shown to cause significant transgene expression in the liver, intestine, spleen, kidney, and brain.

== Activity-on-Target Cytokines ==
Activity-on-Target Cytokines, known as AcTakines, are mutated cytokines that have reduced binding affinity for their native receptor complex and enhanced binding affinity for a specific tumor cell receptor. This causes the cytokine to be inactive in circulation, limiting systemic toxicity. The cytokine is activated upon binding to its tumor-specific antigen, allowing for local delivery. The cytokine tumor necrosis factor (TNF) causes rapid hemorrhagic tumor necrosis in both animal models and patients but is associated with high systemic toxicities. TNF is known to exert its antitumor effect through stromal cells in the tumor microenvironment. A TNF AcTakine was created to improve localized delivery of TNF and decrease systemic toxicity by changing its antitumor pathway to target endothelial cells. This mutated TNF cytokine was shown to only target endothelial cells of the tumor vasculature, allowing for a safe and effective delivery system. This TNF-based AcTakine resulted in a 100-fold increase in targeting efficiency, and when the AcTakine was targeted to CD13 expressed on endothelial cells of the tumor vasculature, it demonstrated selective activation of tumor neovasculature without any detectable toxicity in vivo. When administered with CAR-T cells, this therapy was shown to enhance T cell infiltration to control solid tumors, while combination with a CD8-targeted type II interferon AcTakine led to eradication of solid tumors

== Cytokine factories ==
Cytokine factories are cell-generated cytokines that can locally deliver a cytokine of interest, offering spatial and temporal control of dosing. The homing capacity and tumor tropism capabilities of mesenchymal stem/stromal cells (MSCs) make them ideal drug delivery vehicles. MSCs also have reduced immunogenicity due to their limited expression of costimulatory molecules. Using MSCs to express cytokines provides greater cytokine delivery to the tumor tissue, which increases therapeutic efficacy of the treatment. IL-2 gene engineered MSCs (MSC-IL-2) have been studied as a potential antitumor therapy since IL-2 is an immunogenic cytokine. Intratumoral injection of MSC-IL-2 was shown to significantly regress glioma tumor growth and improve the overall survival of rats with glioma. Similarly, subcutaneous injections of bone marrow MSC-IFN-α affected tumor growth in vivo and increased overall survival in a multiple myeloma mouse model. Antitumor effects were attributed to increased apoptosis of tumor cells, decreased microvessel density, and ischemic necrosis. TRAIL is an immunogenic cytokine that selectively targets tumor cells for apoptosis, reducing systemic toxicity. MSCs engineered to overexpress TRAIL have shown promising antitumor effects in xenograft models through apoptotic pathways. Numerous studies of MSC-TRAIL systems are ongoing, including treatments for neuroblastoma, non-small-cell lung carcinoma, breast cancer, pancreatic cancer, glioblastoma, and multiple myeloma, among others

Human retinal pigmented epithelial (RPE) cells can also be engineered to express a cytokine of interest. RPE cells are ideal cytokine delivery systems because they are nontumorigenic, display contact inhibition, are amenable to genetic modification, have bene previously used in human trials for therapeutic delivery systems, and are safe to use. RPE cells engineered to produce different cytokines were encapsulated in alginate-based microparticles. The encapsulated cells will still viable after encapsulation, did not divide within the capsules, produced the cytokine of interest, and persisted longer in vivo than unencapsulated cells. The IL-2 producing RPE cells eradicated peritoneal tumors in ovarian and colorectal mouse models, and computational modeling of pharmacokinetics, predicts clinical translation to humans, indicating potential success in future human clinical trials
