= CD3 =

CD3 or CD-3 may refer to:

- CD3, or 2020 CD3, a small minimoon of Earth
- CD3 (immunology), an antigen, cluster of differentiation protein (immunology), part of the T cell receptor (TCR) complex on a mature T lymphocyte
- Cost of delay (CD3 Prioritisation), an approach for scheduling work through a scarce resource that maximises Return on Investment
- Ford CD3 platform
- MediaMax CD-3, copy protection scheme
- MiniCD, a 3-inch CD
  - 3-inch CD single
- Color Developing Agent 3, the color developer for E-6 process and VNF-1 process
