= HIPK1 =

Protein-coding gene in humans

Identifiers
- Aliases: HIPK1, Myak, Nbak2, homeodomain interacting protein kinase 1
- External IDs: OMIM: 608003; MGI: 1314873; GeneCards: HIPK1
Enzyme activity
EC #	BRENDA	ExPASy	KEGG	MetaCyc
2.7.11.1	↗	↗	↗	↗

Gene location (Human)
Chr.	Chromosome 1 (human)
Band	1p13.2	Start	113,929,324 bp
Band	1p13.2	End	113,977,869 bp

Gene location (Mouse)
Chr.	Chromosome 3 (mouse)
Band	3|3 F2.2	Start	103,647,131 bp
Band	3|3 F2.2	End	103,698,879 bp
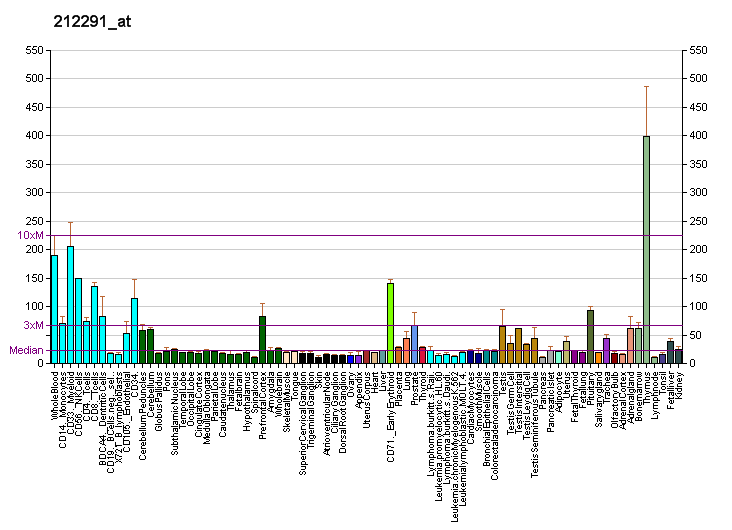

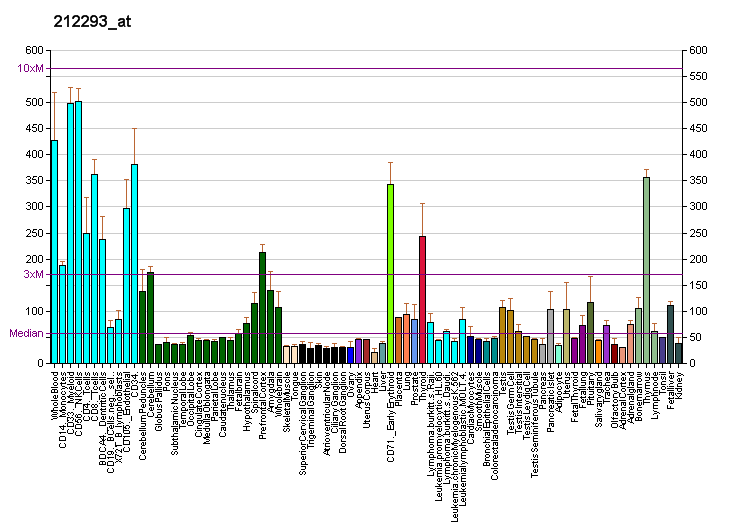
RNA expression pattern
Bgee	Human / Mouse (ortholog); Top expressed in: bronchial epithelial cell; cerebellar vermis; mucosa of paranasal sinus; paraflocculus of cerebellum; Epithelium of choroid plexus; caput epididymis; buccal mucosa cell; thymus; bone marrow; trabecular bone / Top expressed in: vestibular membrane of cochlear duct; blood; tibiofemoral joint; fetal liver hematopoietic progenitor cell; granulocyte; genital tubercle; gastrula; stroma of bone marrow; right lung; submandibular gland; More reference expression data
BioGPS	More reference expression data
Gene ontology
Molecular function	transferase activity; nucleotide binding; protein kinase activity; kinase activity; protein serine/threonine kinase activity; protein binding; ATP binding
Cellular component	cytoplasm; PML body; nuclear speck; nucleus; nucleoplasm; centrosome; cytosol
Biological process	eye development; intrinsic apoptotic signaling pathway in response to DNA damage by p53 class mediator; regulation of transcription, DNA-templated; retina layer formation; extrinsic apoptotic signaling pathway; adherens junction assembly; phosphorylation; iris morphogenesis; regulation of tumor necrosis factor-mediated signaling pathway; transcription, DNA-templated; positive regulation of angiogenesis; protein phosphorylation; embryonic camera-type eye morphogenesis; lens induction in camera-type eye; neuron differentiation; positive regulation of cell population proliferation; embryonic retina morphogenesis in camera-type eye; definitive hemopoiesis; smoothened signaling pathway; endothelial cell apoptotic process; anterior/posterior pattern specification; regulation of signal transduction by p53 class mediator
Sources:Amigo / QuickGO
Orthologs
Databases	NCBI: entry; OMA: entry
Species	Human	Mouse
Entrez	204851	15257
Ensembl	ENSG00000163349	ENSMUSG00000008730
UniProt	Q86Z02	O88904
RefSeq (mRNA)	NM_152696; NM_181358; NM_198268; NM_198269; NM_001369806 NM_001369807	NM_001301304; NM_001301306; NM_010432
RefSeq (protein)	NP_689909; NP_852003; NP_938009; NP_938010; NP_001356735 NP_001356736	NP_001288233; NP_001288235; NP_034562
Location (UCSC)	Chr 1: 113.93 – 113.98 Mb	Chr 3: 103.65 – 103.7 Mb
PubMed search
- Wikidata
View/Edit Human	View/Edit Mouse

Homeodomain-interacting protein kinase 1 is an enzyme that, in humans is encoded by the HIPK1 gene.

== Function ==
The protein encoded by this gene belongs to the Ser/Thr family of protein kinases and HIPK subfamily. It phosphorylates homeodomain transcription factors and may also function as a co-repressor for homeodomain transcription factors. Alternative splicing results in four transcript variants encoding four distinct isoforms.

== Interactions ==
HIPK1 has been shown to interact with P53.
