= WSB1 =

Protein-coding gene in the species Homo sapiens

Identifiers
- Aliases: WSB1, SWIP1, WSB-1, WD repeat and SOCS box containing 1
- External IDs: OMIM: 610091; MGI: 1926139; GeneCards: WSB1

Gene location (Human)
Chr.	Chromosome 17 (human)
Band	17q11.1	Start	27,294,076 bp
Band	17q11.1	End	27,315,926 bp

Gene location (Mouse)
Chr.	Chromosome 11 (mouse)
Band	11|11 B5	Start	79,130,198 bp
Band	11|11 B5	End	79,145,497 bp
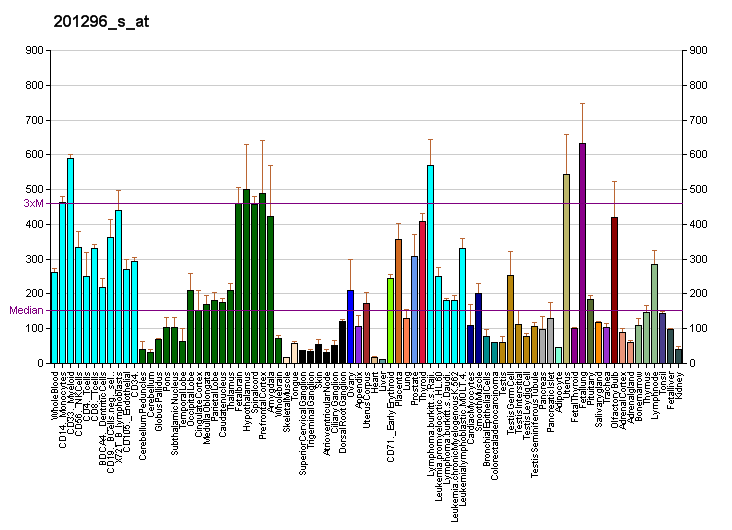

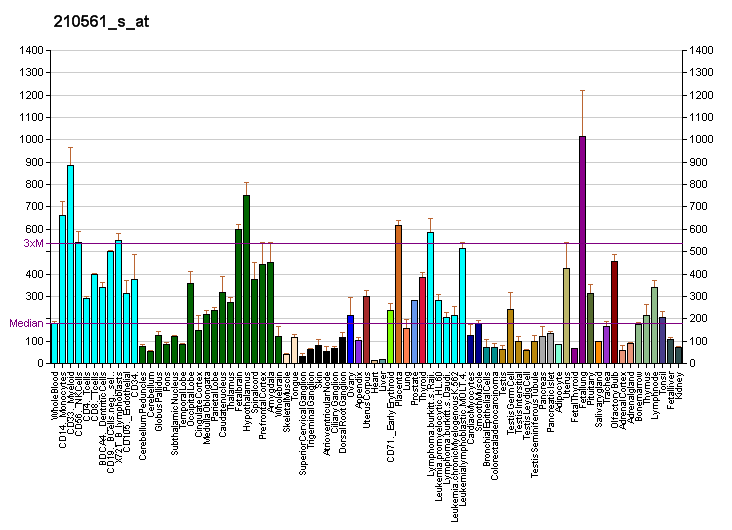
RNA expression pattern
Bgee	Human / Mouse (ortholog); Top expressed in: corpus callosum; gastric mucosa; lower lobe of lung; inferior ganglion of vagus nerve; tibial nerve; Region I of hippocampus proper; tibial arteries; canal of the cervix; endothelial cell; left uterine tube / Top expressed in: medullary collecting duct; cumulus cell; neural tube; dorsomedial hypothalamic nucleus; pineal gland; vas deferens; dermis; paraventricular nucleus of hypothalamus; ventral tegmental area; Gonadal ridge; More reference expression data
BioGPS	More reference expression data
Gene ontology
Molecular function	protein binding; ubiquitin-protein transferase activity
Cellular component	intracellular anatomical structure; cytosol
Biological process	protein ubiquitination; intracellular signal transduction; protein polyubiquitination; post-translational protein modification; biological process
Sources:Amigo / QuickGO
Orthologs
Databases	NCBI: entry; OMA: entry
Species	Human	Mouse
Entrez	26118	78889
Ensembl	ENSG00000109046	ENSMUSG00000017677
UniProt	Q9Y6I7	O54927
RefSeq (mRNA)	NM_015626; NM_134264; NM_134265; NM_001348350	NM_001042565; NM_019653
RefSeq (protein)	NP_056441; NP_599027; NP_001335279	NP_001036030; NP_062627
Location (UCSC)	Chr 17: 27.29 – 27.32 Mb	Chr 11: 79.13 – 79.15 Mb
PubMed search
- Wikidata
View/Edit Human	View/Edit Mouse

WD repeat and SOCS box-containing protein 1 is a protein that in humans is encoded by the WSB1 gene.

This gene encodes a member of the WD-protein subfamily. This protein shares a high sequence identity to mouse and chick proteins. It contains several WD-repeats spanning most of the protein and an SOCS box in the C-terminus. Alternatively spliced transcript variants encoding distinct isoforms have been found for this gene.
