= Gene therapy for blood diseases =

Blood that has been modified for therapeutic or other purposes

Gene therapy for blood diseases is a novel field of research investigating ways in which components of blood can be genetically modified to treat hematologic diseases.

== Current clinical applications ==
=== CAR-T therapy targeting leukemia ===
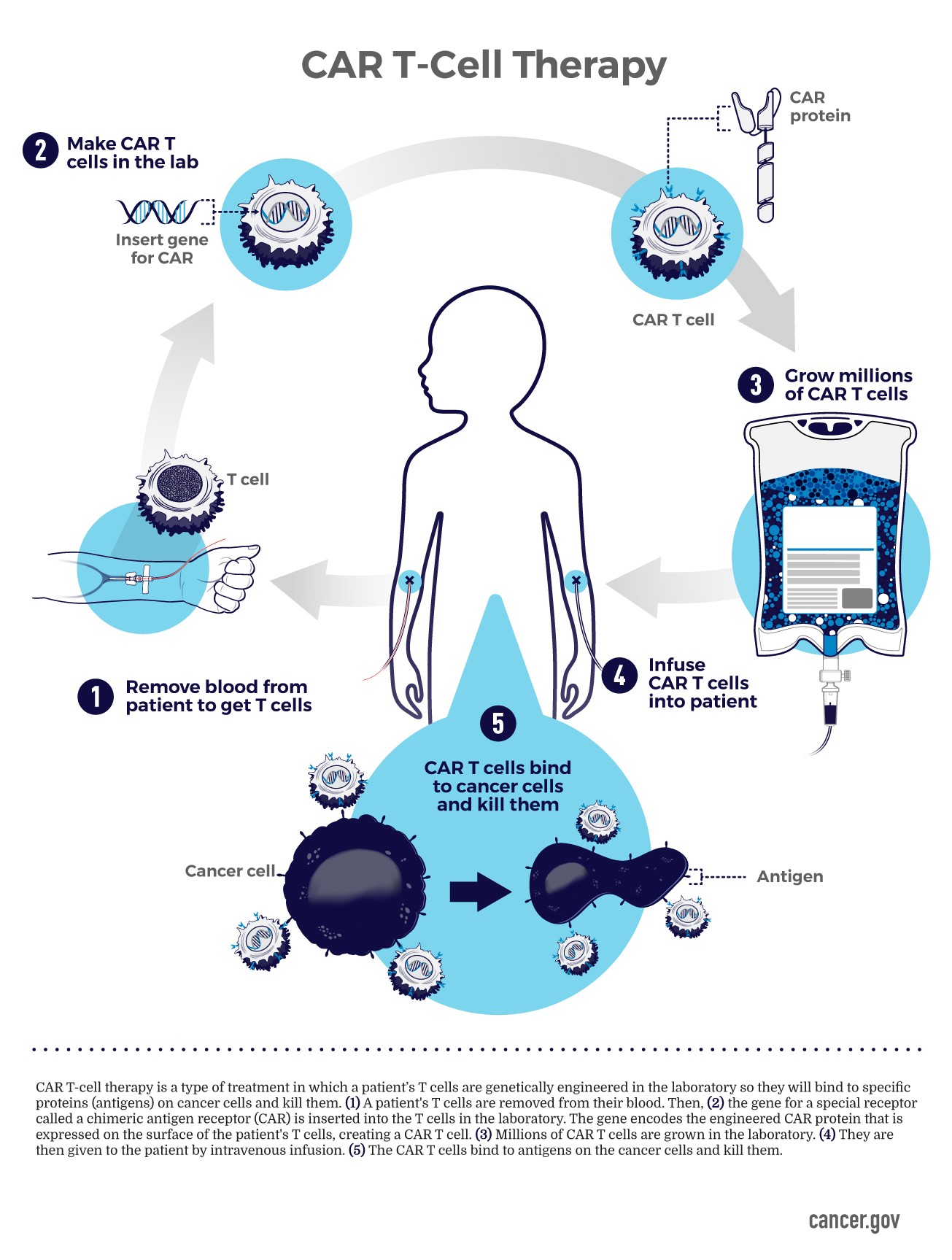
A diagram depicting CAR T-cell therapy from the National Cancer Institute (NCI)

CAR T-cell therapy is a type of personalized cancer immunotherapy designed to strengthen the patient's own immune system to better fight cancer. The process begins by extracting T-cells, a type of immune cell, from an individual patient's blood. The surface of cancer cells contains unique markers called antigens. The patient's T-cells are genetically modified in laboratories to include chimeric antigen receptors (CARs). The CARs are designed to recognize the specific cancer antigens and bind to them, allowing T-cells to target and attack the cancer cells. The genetically modified T-cells are administered back to the patients as a treatment.

Leukemia is a group of blood cancers commonly found in children younger than 15 and elders older than 55. In 2017, tisagenlecleucel (Kymriah™), the first CAR-T cell therapy approved by the FDA, became available to anyone up to the age of 25 with acute lymphoblastic leukemia (ALL). Until 2022, a total of six CAR-T therapies have been approved by the FDA, all of which target blood cancers. These CAR-T therapies have been shown to have high efficacy in eradicating leukemia cancer, including in patients with advanced-stage, treatment-resistant (refractory) or returned (relapsed) leukemia. They also have a high remission rate in comparison to other traditional cancer treatments.

=== Hematopoietic stem cell therapy targeting sickle cell disease ===
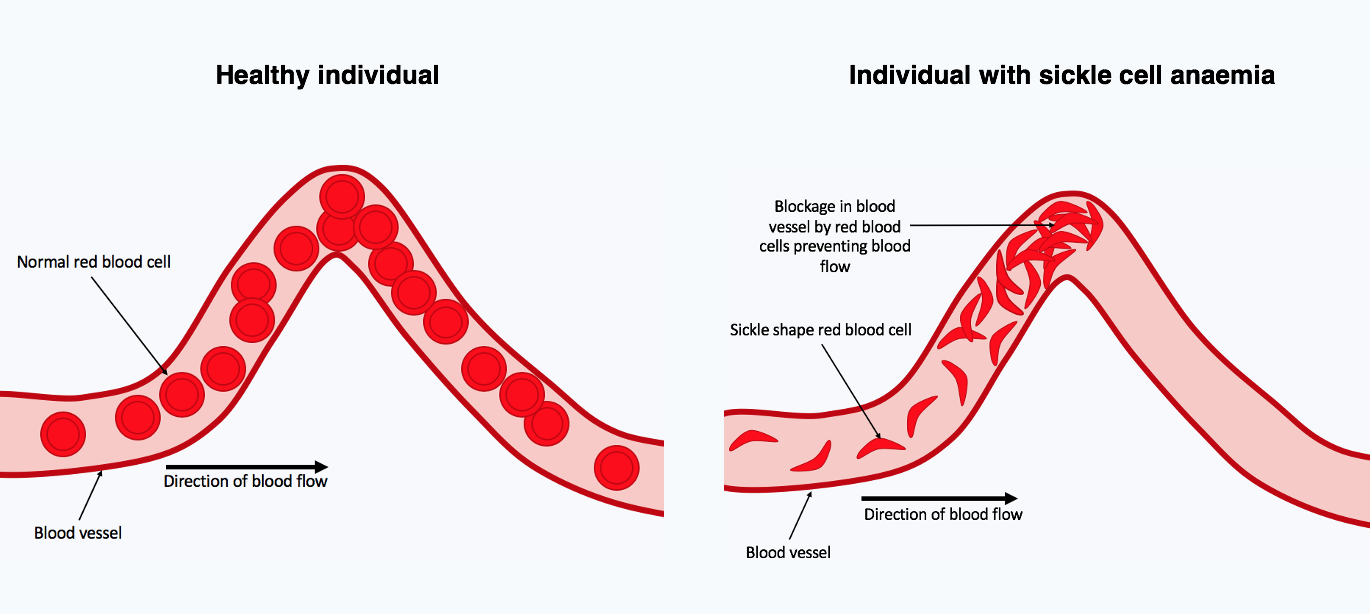
Comparison between healthy red blood cells and red blood cells in an individual with sickle cell anemia.

Patients in the U.S. suffering from sickle cell disease can now receive targeted gene therapies using hematopoietic stem cells. Hematopoietic stem cells are stem cells which differentiate and give rise to red blood cells, white blood cells and platelets. These therapies involve removing hematopoietic stem cells from the patient and making specific edits to the genome of the hematopoietic stem cells. These edits in the genome of the hematopoietic stem cells are to reverse the effects of sickle cell disease. The cells are then re-administered into the patient. The hematopoietic stem cells are then able to produce red blood cells with the factors which promote proper red blood cell shape reducing the effects of sickle cell disease.

=== Gene editing therapy for beta thalassemia ===
Beta thalassemia is a heritable disorder, characterized by the inability to make beta globin protein, and in turn reduced functioning of hemoglobin (which beta globin is a part of). In December 2023, the European Medicines Agency recommended approval for a cell based gene therapy that works through the CRISPR/Cas9 system. The therapy known as Casgevy works through editing a dysfunctional protein that interferes with creation of adult hemoglobin. This gene is known as the BCL11A, and when people have Beta thalassemia, their bodies do not make enough adult hemoglobin. Casgevy uses precise gene editing of stem cells, and reduces the activity of BCL11A. With the subsequent reduction of adult hemoglobin, fetal hemoglobin (HbF) genes are turned back on, allowing the cells to produce enough hemoglobin. Typically, the body stops making fetal hemoglobin around 6 months of age, and starts making adult hemoglobin. These serve similar functions, however fetal hemoglobin has a higher binding affinity for oxygen than adult hemoglobin, but both are functional at transporting oxygen in the body. Stem cells edited by Casgevy are then transfused back into the body where they can create more HbF and therefore make more functional red blood cells that have this edit. With this therapy, patients who would regularly need blood transfusions can now produce enough hemoglobin for themselves.

=== Genome editing for HIV resistance ===
Human immunodeficiency virus (HIV) is a disease that, once contacted, attacks cells that are necessary to fight off infections. It can be transmitted in many different ways, including through sexual contact, blood contamination, the sharing of needles, or from mother to infant. If left untreated, HIV can result in acquired immunodeficiency syndrome (AIDS). HIV weakens an individual's immune system, leading to increased risk of fatal infections and cancers. In 2023, around 40 million people globally were living with HIV. Despite options available for the treatment and management of HIV (e.g., highly active antiretroviral therapy; HAART), they come with limitations including the need for indefinite daily treatment. Attempts to generate a long-term HIV-resistant immune system have been promising with results from a case report of a patient who developed acute myeloid leukemia after HIV infection. Previously, researchers had found a version of a gene (an allele) that was resistant to HIV. These researchers therefore found a donor who had two copies of this allele (homozygous) and extracted their stem cells in an attempt to produce HIV resistance in the patient with acute myeloid leukemia. After stem cell transplantation from this donor, the patient tested and remained HIV-negative at 20 months post-transplantation and was able to discontinue use of antiviral therapies.
