= Tandem exon duplication =

Tandem exon duplication is defined as duplication of exons within the same gene to give rise to the subsequent exon. A complete exon analysis of all genes in Homo sapiens, Drosophila melanogaster, and Caenorhabditis elegans has shown 12,291 instances of tandem duplication in exons in human, fly, and worm. Analysis of the intronic region has produced further 4,660 unidentified duplicated exons referred to as unannotated exons. 1,578 of these unannotated exons contained stop codons thus not considered potential exons. 35.1% of the unannotated exons were found in the EST sequence thus confirming the potential of the presence of these exons in protein transcripts.

== See also ==
- Exon shuffling
- Gene duplication
