= HIPK3 =

Protein-coding gene in the species Homo sapiens

Identifiers
- Aliases: HIPK3, DYRK6, FIST3, PKY, YAK1, homeodomain interacting protein kinase 3
- External IDs: OMIM: 604424; MGI: 1314882; HomoloGene: 55923; GeneCards: HIPK3; OMA:HIPK3 - orthologs

Gene location (Human)
Chr.	Chromosome 11 (human)
Band	11p13	Start	33,256,672 bp
Band	11p13	End	33,357,023 bp

Gene location (Mouse)
Chr.	Chromosome 2 (mouse)
Band	2|2 E2	Start	104,256,826 bp
Band	2|2 E2	End	104,324,791 bp
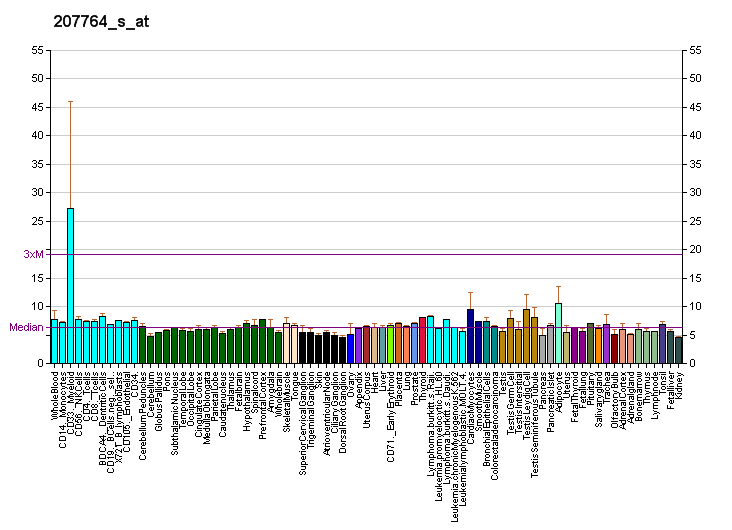

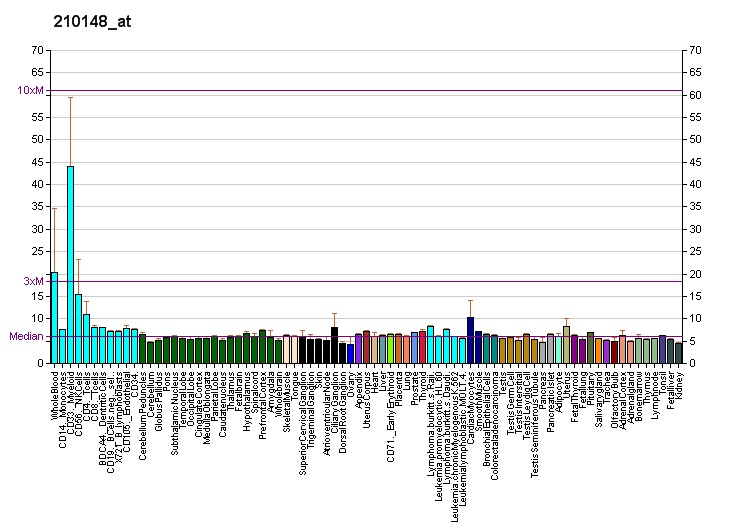
RNA expression pattern
Bgee	Human / Mouse (ortholog); Top expressed in: endothelial cell; Skeletal muscle tissue of biceps brachii; right ventricle; parietal pleura; tail of epididymis; Skeletal muscle tissue of rectus abdominis; visceral pleura; germinal epithelium; gingival epithelium; saphenous vein / Top expressed in: vastus lateralis muscle; atrioventricular valve; triceps brachii muscle; atrium; ankle; left lung lobe; temporal muscle; sternocleidomastoid muscle; intercostal muscle; digastric muscle; More reference expression data
BioGPS	More reference expression data
Gene ontology
Molecular function	kinase activity; transferase activity; protein kinase activity; nucleotide binding; protein serine/threonine kinase activity; ATP binding
Cellular component	PML body; nucleus; cytoplasm; cytosol; nuclear body
Biological process	protein phosphorylation; mRNA transcription; peptidyl-threonine phosphorylation; regulation of transcription, DNA-templated; negative regulation of apoptotic process; negative regulation of JUN kinase activity; peptidyl-serine phosphorylation; transcription, DNA-templated; phosphorylation; apoptotic process
Sources:Amigo / QuickGO
Orthologs
Species	Human	Mouse
Entrez	10114	15259
Ensembl	ENSG00000110422	ENSMUSG00000027177
UniProt	Q9H422	Q9ERH7
RefSeq (mRNA)	NM_001048200; NM_001278162; NM_001278163; NM_005734	NM_001145824; NM_010434
RefSeq (protein)	NP_001041665; NP_001265091; NP_001265092; NP_005725	NP_001139296; NP_034564
Location (UCSC)	Chr 11: 33.26 – 33.36 Mb	Chr 2: 104.26 – 104.32 Mb
PubMed search
- Wikidata
View/Edit Human	View/Edit Mouse

Homeodomain-interacting protein kinase 3 is an enzyme in humans that is encoded by the HIPK3 gene.
