= Broermann Medical Innovation Award =

Medical innovation prize

The Broermann Medical Innovation Award is an international prize to honor groundbreaking medical science and healthcare innovation achievements. Established in 2024 and endowed with €1 million, it recognizes individuals or teams whose work has or has the potential to advance medical research and patient care significantly. The award ceremony will be held yearly in the Hessian State Chancellery in Wiesbaden.

== History and background ==
The award was established by Bernard Broermann, a German lawyer, businessman, and founder of the Asklepios Kliniken Clinics Group, who died in 2024. He wanted to reward scientists who help humanity through medical innovation with recognition, money, and prestige as part of his will.

== Laureates ==
The Broermann Medical Innovation Award honors scientists whose research demonstrates outstanding scientific excellence and has advanced, or shows strong potential to advance, medical care. The award emphasizes clinical and translational applications with tangible patient impact.

=== 2026 ===
- Richard DiMarchi – Recognized for his pioneering contributions to peptide-based drug design, which have transformed the treatment of diabetes, obesity, and other metabolic diseases.
- Svetlana Mojsov – Recognized for her groundbreaking discovery and characterization of the biologically active form of GLP-1, which laid the foundation for a new generation of treatments for diabetes and obesity.
- Matthias Tschöp – Recognized for his pioneering research into the biological mechanisms underlying obesity and diabetes, which has driven the development of transformative therapies for metabolic diseases.

2025

- Carl June – Honored for his pioneering work in CAR T cell therapy, which reprograms patients’ immune cells to target and destroy cancer cells. June’s research led to the first successful treatment of a child with relapsed acute lymphoblastic leukemia, marking a major breakthrough in immunotherapy.
- Michel Sadelain – Recognized for his fundamental contributions to the development and engineering of CAR T cell therapy, including innovations in T-cell design and translational strategies that have made these therapies widely applicable in clinical practice.
