= Arturo Zychlinsky =

Biologist (born 1962)

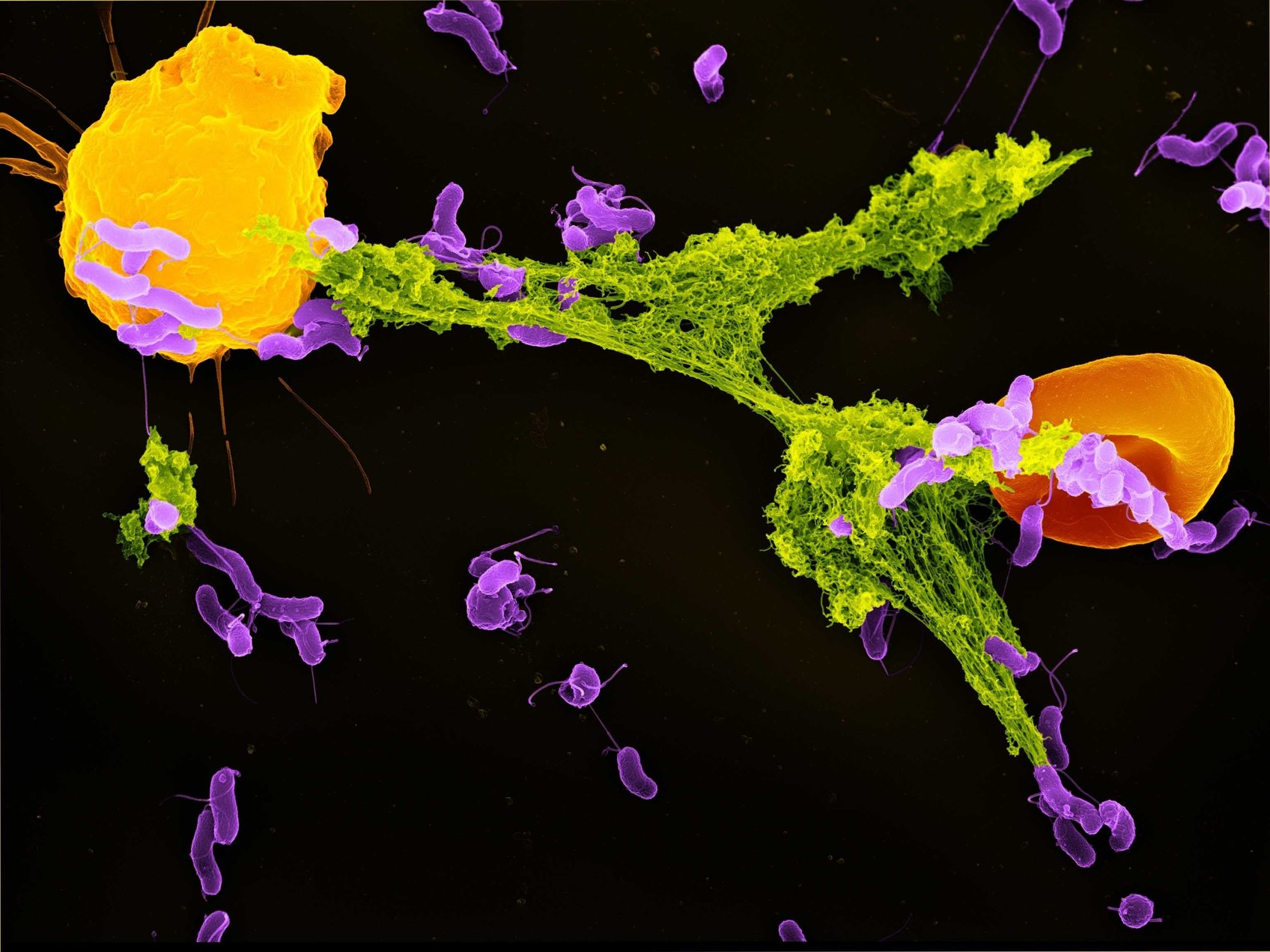
Arturo Zychlinsky discovered Neutrophil Extracellular Traps (NETs) together with Volker Brinkmann. This scanning electron image shows a NET (green), ejected by a neutrophil (yellow) to capture bacteria (purple). A red blood cell (orange) is also trapped in the NET.

Arturo Zychlinsky (born 1962) is a biologist and since 2001 director at the Max Planck Institute for Infection Biology. His research focuses on Neutrophil Extracellular Traps (NETs) which he discovered together with Volker Brinkmann, and the immune function of chromatin.

== Life ==
Arturo Zychlinsky completed his undergraduate studies at the Escuela Nacional de Ciencias Biológicas in Mexico City. In 1991, he obtained his PhD at the Rockefeller University where he trained with Ding-E Young in the laboratory of Zanvil Cohn. From 1991 to 1993 he was an EMBO postdoctoral fellow with Philippe J. Sansonetti at the Institut Pasteur. He then moved to the Skirball Institute, New York University School of Medicine, where he took a position as Assistant and Associate Professor. Since 2001, he is director of the Department for Cellular Microbiology at the Max Planck Institute for Infection Biology in Berlin.

== Research ==
Arturo Zychlinsky made several fundamental contributions including the first description that bacterial pathogens cause cell death and therefore induce inflammation. He worked on the activation of Toll Like Receptors and their role in immunity and he has made key contributions to understanding the role of neutrophils in innate immunity, including the discovery of NETs, the description of Netosis, a novel form of cell death required for the release of NETs, the mechanism of NET formation, the role of NETs in immunity and autoimmunity

== Awards and honors ==
Arturo Zychlinsky received the Irma T. Hirschl Career Scientist Award, and the Eva and Klaus Grohe Award of the Berlin-Brandenburg Academy of Sciences. He is a member of the European Molecular Biology Organization (EMBO), the German National Academy of Sciences Leopoldina, the American Society and Academy of Microbiology, and the European Academy of Microbiology.

== Personal life ==
Zychlinsky is married to the German zoologist and neuroethologist Constance Scharff; they have two daughters.
