= Antoni Garrell i Guiu =

Spanish engineer

Antoni Garrell i Guiu (l'Espluga de Francolí, Spain, 1953) is a Spanish industrial engineer, and a specialist in innovation management and in the knowledge economy. He was founder of Cercle per al Coneixement (The Circle for the Knowledge Foundation) and promoter of Fundació Indicis, which focuses on sustainability issues and climate. Since 2021 Antoni Garrell has been the president of HM Hospitals in Catalonia, of the group HM Hospitales.

== Biography ==
Antoni Garrell co-founded the Cercle per al Coneixement, an independent civil organization that pioneered and promoted the creation of a knowledge park reference, which helped to place the economy and society of knowledge in Catalonia.

From 1998 to 2021, he was the CEO of the Foundation for Textile Design (FUNDIT), which leads the Escola Superior de Disseny, a center affiliated to the Ramon Llull University. The Foundation for Textile Design also holds l'Escola d'Arts i Tècniques de la Moda de Barcelona (the Arts and Fashion Techniques School from Barcelona). Holding this post Antoni Garrell became one of the main promoters of research in the field of design and for its recognition as official Undergraduate University Degree in Spain. In 2008 the Escola Superior de Disseny was one of the first schools in Spain to provide the Official Undergraduate University Degree in Design. This degree meets the guidelines established by the European Higher Education Area (EHEA) in the following specialisations: Graphic Design, Fashion Design, Product Design, Interior Design, Audiovisual Design, Integrated Multidisciplinary Design.

Antoni Garrell promoted and organized the first International Congress of Design and Innovation in Catalonia. He is one of the founders and leaders of the Fundació Indicis (Signs Foundation); a group in charge of sustainability and climate change and promoting research institutes to act as a bridge between universities and industry, and doing so by practicing sustainable development, such as eco-design and the prevention of climate change. This initiative partly explains his vision for improving competitiveness and adaptation to new demands in a globalized economy.

In recent years, his career has been closely linked to the city of Sabadell, where he has been active in promoting various regional economic institutions. He's been a member, among others, of the Fòrum econòmic de Sabadell (Economic Forum from Sabadell), Fira Sabadell, (The Sabadell Fair) Cambra de Comerç de Sabadell, (Commerce Chamber from Sabadell) and of the Gremi de Fabricants de Sabadell, (the Union of Manufacturers from Sabadell).

Among Antoni Garrell's goals while leading the Cercle per al Coneixement, was to initiate a cycle of conferences about the role of the universities in the society of knowledge. The first session was held at the Aula Magna of the University of Barcelona with the participation of presidents of major universities in Catalonia. They talked about research at universities and the two-way transfer of knowledge between them and the companies. Their findings were gathered and documentedLa Vanguardia extensively in the newspaper. They are referred to in this article.

== Contribution to design and the study of competitiveness ==
Antoni Garrell i Guiu's professional activity has been accompanied with significant academic work. He has taught and lectured at Spanish and foreign universities, spoke in multiple conferences in different events and taught in international conferences on competitiveness and innovation. For example, the Third Congress of the Observatory for Cybersociety in 2006 with the plenary lecture "Competition in the 21st century requires a free and open access to knowledge". He is the author of books on design, digital and multimedia systems, and has written over 400 articles on technical economics. Among his greatest impacts appears "The binomial science - business" published in the newspaper El País on 14 March 2006 and other papers. He is also the founder of the technological magazine INPUT and director of the collection "Papers per a debat".

== Publications ==
- GARRELL i GUIU A, 'Productos y Servicios inteligentes y sostenibles' Barcelona Editorial, Marge Books · feb. 2021, ISBN 9788418532382
- GARRELL i GUIU, A. La Industria 4.0 en la sociedad digital. Barcelona: Editorial Marge Books, 2019. (Colección Gestiona) ISBN 978-84-17313-85-2
- GARRELL i GUIU, A. Discovering the design. Sabadell: FUNDIT - Escola Superior de Disseny ESDi, 2011. (Papers per a debat; 6) ISBN 978-84-936165-3-3
- GARRELL i GUIU, A. [et al.]. The Society of Knowledge, an opportunity for Catalonia, challenges and instruments. Barcelona: Cercle per al Coneixement, 2002. ISBN 84-607-6217-3 (Find it en el Catàleg Col·lectiu de les Universitats de Catalunya)
- CLIMENT I FERRER, A.; GARRELL i GUIU, A. Introduction to Design. Barcelona: Enginyeria i arquitectura La Salle, 1999 ISBN 84-922538-5-1 (Find it en el Catàleg Col·lectiu de les Universitats de Catalunya)
- GARRELL i GUIU, A.; SERRA DEL PINO, JORDI. The futur of Design. Sabadell: FUNDIT, 1999. ISBN 84-931110-0-7 (Find it en el Catàleg Col·lectiu de les Universitats de Catalunya)
- GINESTA LÓPEZ, X.; GARRELL i GUIU, A.; SOLER I CANTALOSELLA, J. Multimedia, the motor of progress. Barcelona: Escola d'Enginyeria La Salle (URL), 1997. ISBN 84-922538-1-9 (Find it en el Catàleg Col·lectiu de les Universitats de Catalunya)
- GARRELL i GUIU, A.; CLIMENT I FERRER, A. Design of Digital Systems. Barcelona: Bruño/EUETT, 1992. ISBN 84-216-1717-6 (Find it en el Catàleg Col·lectiu de les Universitats de Catalunya)
