= Abarca Prize =

- Doctor Juan Abarca International Award for Medical Sciences
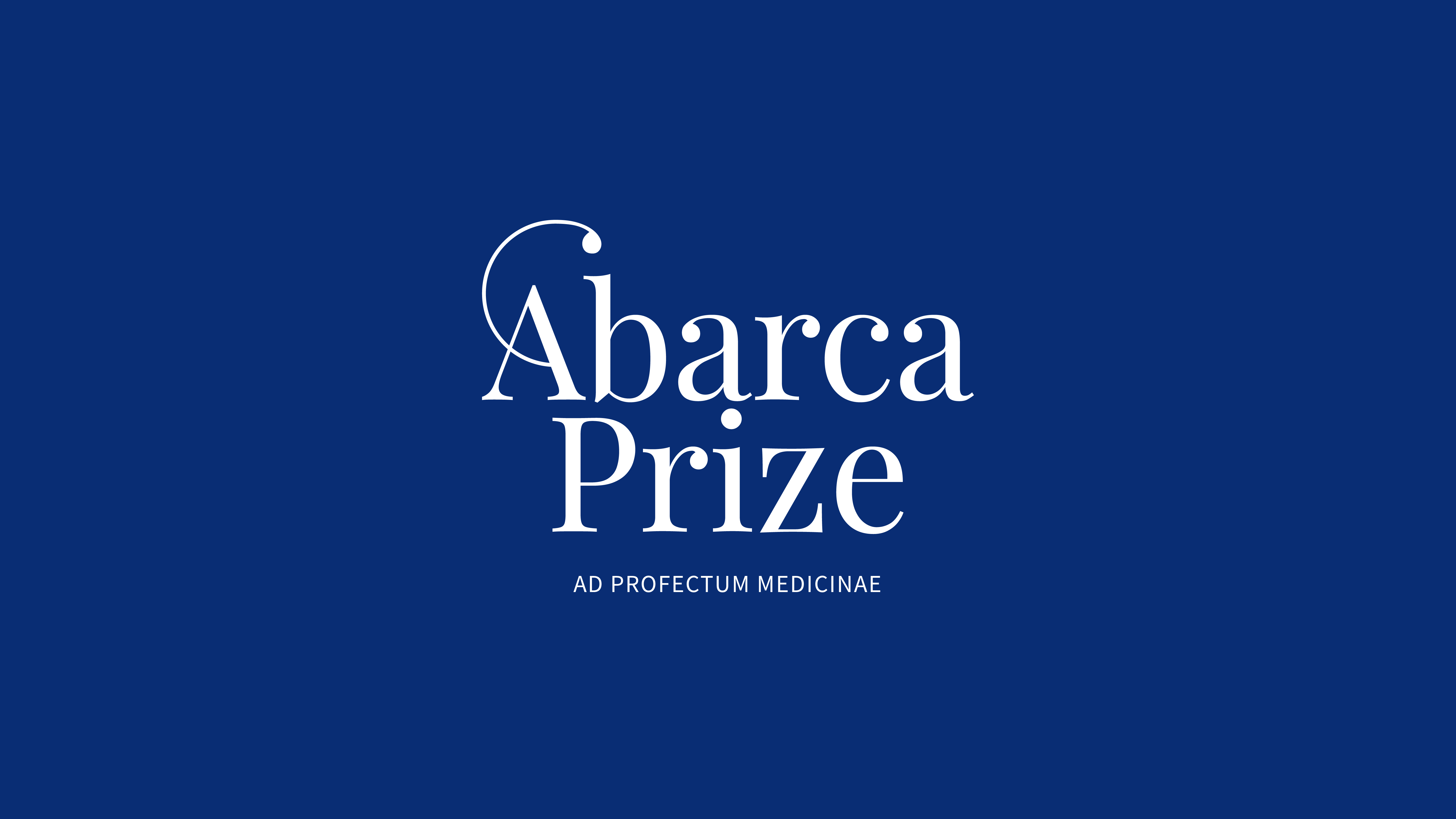
- Awarded for: Biomedical research of global significance
- Sponsored by: Fundación de Investigación HM Hospitales
- Country: Spain
- Reward: 100,000 €
- Established: 2021
- Website: https://www.abarcaprize.com/

The Doctor Juan Abarca International Award in Medical Sciences, known as the Abarca Prize, is an award that recognises research and innovation through a biomedical finding of global significance.

== Background ==
Created in 2020 by the Fundación de Investigación HM Hospitales, it is awarded to the scientific or medical career of a person who has made a significant contribution to the protection, improvement or rehabilitation of people's health.

The award, endowed with 100,000 euros, is inspired by the Spanish surgeon Juan Abarca Campal, founder of HM Hospitales. The jury, appointed by the Fundación de Investigación HM Hospitales, is made up of members of the scientific community.

== Abarca Prize ==
=== 2021 ===
The first edition of the award was held in October 2021. The award ceremony was chaired by King Felipe VI. The jury was headed by Alberto Muñoz, professor at the Instituto de Investigaciones Biomédicas de Madrid (IIBM) and included Richard Horton, editor of The Lancet, Silvia G. Priori, scientific director of the ICS Maugeri Hospital, palaeoanthropologist Juan Luis Arsuaga, and Federico de Montalvo, former president of the Spanish Bioethics Committee. The Abarca Prize was awarded to Professor Jean-Laurent Casanova for his findings in the field of human infections and the genetic variations that affect a person's ability to fight them. Dr. Casanova is a researcher at Rockefeller University Hospital in New York and director of the St. Giles Laboratory of Human Genetics and Infectious Diseases.

=== 2022 ===
In 2022 the prize was awarded to Professor Philippe J. Sansonetti of the Pasteur Institute for his research on Shigellosis or bacillary dysentery. This diarrheal disease caused by the bacterium Shigella causes thousands of deaths annually in developed countries, mainly affecting children. The jury was composed of Professors Juan Luis Arsuaga, Silvia Priori, Jean-Laurent Casanova and Federico de Montalvo, and was chaired by Professor Alberto Muñoz, from the Institute of Biomedical Research of Madrid (IIB- CSIC). The award was presented by the Spanish Secretary of State for Health, Silvia Calzón.

=== 2023 ===
Professor Douglas A. Melton, won the III Abarca Prize in its 2023 call, for his advances towards a cure for diabetes. Douglas A. Melton is co-director of the Harvard Stem Cell Institute, a Howard Hughes Institute of Medicine investigator and an investigator at Vertex Pharmaceuticals.

Melton's research has pioneered the process of converting stem cells into insulin-producing beta cells, which would enable cell replacement therapy for type 1 diabetes. The award was presented by the Spanish Minister of Health, José Miñones.

=== 2024 ===
The immunologist Carl H. June, director of the Parker Institute for Cancer Immunotherapy at the University of Pennsylvania, was awarded the fourth prize for the discovery of a revolutionary therapy for treating blood cancers based on cellular engineering. The CAR-T (chimeric antigen receptor) cell therapy harnesses the body's own immune system to fight cancer. Carl H. June is the Richard W. Vague Professor of Immunotherapy at the Vague School of Medicine at the University of Pennsylvania. In 2024, his scientific team is working to apply this treatment to other solid neoplasms, autoimmune diseases (such as lupus) and other non-oncological diseases. The jury for the 4th edition was made up of Professors Silvia Priori, who chaired the jury, Philippe J. Sansonetti, Pura Muñoz-Cánoves, Sandra Myrna Diaz, Federico de Montalvo, Juan Luis Arsuaga and the winner of the 2023 call, Professor Douglas A. Melton. Dr June was received by King Felipe VI after the award ceremony, together with Juan Abarca Cidón, President of HM Hospitales, Elena Abarca Cidón, Vice-President of HM Hospitales, and Alberto Muñoz Terol, President of the HM Hospitales Research Foundation.

=== 2025 ===
In 2025, the fifth edition of the award was presented to Dutch scientist Hans Clevers. A biologist and immunologist, Clevers's research into organoid technology has earned him recognition from the scientific community. He is a professor of Molecular genetics at Utrecht University and a driving force behind the Institute for Human Biology (IHB). His research into organoid technology enables the simulation of human organs and the modelling of individual pathologies, allowing treatments to be adapted to the specific conditions of each patient. According to Dr Clevers, "organoids can predict with 85% accuracy whether a drug will be effective against cancer". The award was presented by Spanish Health Minister Mónica García on 30 October 2025.

=== 2026 ===
In 2026, the sixth edition of the prize was awarded to Helen Hobbs, a Howard Hughes Medical Institute researcher and professor of internal medicine and molecular genetics at the University of Texas Southwestern Medical Centre. The award recognised her discoveries concerning how certain genetic variations can protect against heart and liver diseases, as well as her contributions to the development of new treatments.

Hobbs and Jonathan C. Cohen identified variations in the PCSK9 gene that lower LDL cholesterol and reduce the risk of coronary heart disease. These findings have contributed to the development of new cholesterol-lowering medicines. Her team also discovered variations in the PNPLA3 and TM6SF2 genes that increase the risk of fatty liver disease and other liver conditions.

The jury, chaired by Silvia Priori, comprised Philippe J. Sansonetti, Douglas Melton, Carl H. June, Hans Clevers, Pura Muñoz-Cánoves, Sandra Myrna Díaz and Deborah Burks. The decision was announced on 1 October, with the award ceremony scheduled for 28 October 2026 in Madrid.

== Abarca Prize Calls ==
Edition	Year	Winners	Scientific contribution
I Edition	2021	Jean-Laurent Casanova	Insights into human infections and their genetic control
II Edition	2022	Philippe J. Sansonetti	Research on shigellosis or bacillary dysentery
III Edition	2023	Douglas A. Melton	Advances in diabetes care
IV Edition	2024	Carl H. June	CAR-T cell therapy for the treatment of blood cancers
V Edition	2025	Hans Clevers	Research and development of organoid technology
VI Edition	2026	Helen Hobbs	Discoveries about genes that helped develop treatments for heart and liver diseases.
