= Michel Sadelain =

American immunologist

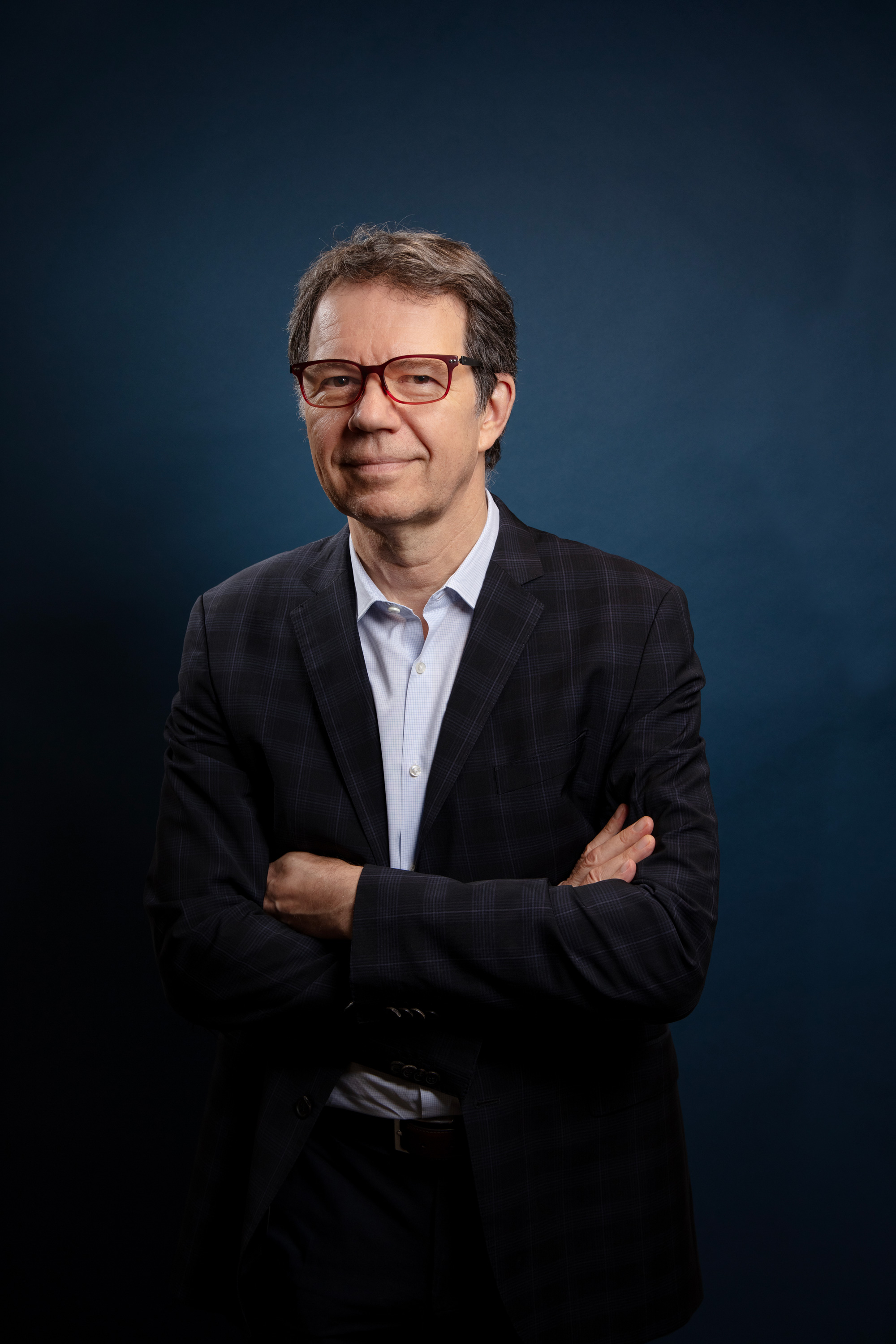
- Michel Sadelain, Genetic Engineer and Cell Therapist
- Born: 1960 (age 65–66); Paris, France
- Education: University of Paris; University of Alberta; Massachusetts Institute of Technology (MIT)
- Known for: T cell engineering; Chimeric antigen receptor (CAR) therapy; Globin gene therapy
- Awards: 2018 Passano Award; 2019 Jacob and Louise Gabbay Award in Biotechnology and Medicine; 2019 INSERM International Prize; 2020 Leopold Griffuel Award; 2021 ASGCT Outstanding Achievement Award; 2023 AACR Elected Fellow; 2023/24 Meyenburg Prize; 2024 Breakthrough Prize in Life Sciences; 2024 Canada Gairdner International Award; 2024 Warren Alpert Foundation Prize; 2025 King Faisal Prize; 2025 Merkin Prize; 2025 Broermann Medical Innovation Award; 2025 BBVA Foundation Frontiers of Knowledge Award; 2026 Tang Prize
- Scientific career
- Workplaces: Memorial Sloan Kettering Cancer Center; Columbia University Irving Medical Center; Herbert Irving Comprehensive Cancer Center
- Website: Michel Sadelain, MD, PhD

Michel W. Sadelain (born 1960) is a genetic engineer and cell therapist at Columbia University New York, New York. He is the Director of the Columbia Initiative in Cell Engineering and Therapy (CICET). Sadelain also serves as the Director of Columbia University Irving Medical Center's Cancer Cell Therapy Initiative in the Herbert Irving Comprehensive Cancer Center. Sadelain was previously the Steve and Barbara Friedman Chair, founding director of the Center for Cell Engineering, and the head of the Gene Transfer and Gene Expression Laboratory at Memorial Sloan Kettering Cancer Center. He is best known for his major contributions to T cell engineering and chimeric antigen receptor (CAR) therapy, an immunotherapy based on the genetic engineering of a patient's own T cells to treat cancer. Sadelain also pioneered the use of lentiviral vectors to treat severe hemoglobinopathies such as β-thalassemia and sickle cell disease. Sadelain is an elected member of the National Academy of Medicine of France and the American Academy of Arts & Sciences.

== Education and career ==
Sadelain was born in 1960 in Paris, France, where he earned his MD at the University of Paris, France, in 1984. After obtaining his PhD in immunology at the University of Alberta in Edmonton, Canada, in 1989, he trained as a postdoctoral fellow at the Whitehead Institute for Biomedical Research, Massachusetts Institute of Technology (MIT) in Cambridge, Massachusetts. While at MIT, Sadelain began his research on genetic engineering. In 1994, Sadelain joined Memorial Sloan Kettering as an assistant member in the Sloan Kettering Institute, where he established programs on human hematopoietic stem cell and T cell engineering. In 2008, he founded the Center for Cell Engineering at Memorial Sloan Kettering. He is a past president of the American Society of Cell and Gene Therapy (2014–2015) and previously served on its board of directors from 2004 to 2007. He served as a member of the Recombinant DNA Advisory Committee (RAC) of the NIH from 2013 to 2015. In 2024, Sadelain was appointed Columbia University as the Director of the Columbia Initiative in Cell Engineering and Therapy (CICET). Sadelain also serves as the Director of Columbia University Irving Medical Center's Cancer Cell Therapy Initiative in the Herbert Irving Comprehensive Cancer Center.

== Research ==
Sadelain and his team study gene transfer in hematopoietic stem cells and T cells, the regulation of transgene expression, the biology of chimeric antigen receptors, and therapeutic strategies to enhance immunity against cancer. Sadelain is a recognized leader in the conceptualization and design of synthetic receptors for antigen, which he named chimeric antigen receptors (CARs). T cells can be engineered to express a CAR to acquire the ability to recognize and destroy cancer cells. Sadelain has referred to CAR T cells as a "living drug." A CAR typically comprises an antibody fragment (scFv) to recognize the cancer and a modular signaling domain to activate the T cell and promote T cell multiplication and persistence. CAR T cells are made by extracting a cancer patient's T cells, inserting a CAR into the cell using a vector such as a gamma-retroviral or lentiviral vector, and then re-infusing the genetically instructed T cells. Sadelain's current research makes use of genome editing, which he showed makes better CAR T cells when the CAR is expressed from the TRAC locus.

Sadelain's laboratory designed second generation CARs, which are endowed with both activating and costimulatory properties, which is integral to the success of CAR therapies. In 2003, Sadelain's lab identified CD19 as a target for CAR therapy in mice. Following the establishment of clinical CAR T cell manufacturing by Dr. Isabelle Rivière at MSK, Sadelain's team was the first to report on molecular complete responses induced by CD19 CAR T cells in adults with relapsed, refractory acute lymphoblastic leukemia. The MSK team received FDA breakthrough designation for this treatment in 2014. The US FDA approved the first CAR therapies, targeting CD19 with second generations CARs, in 2017.

Sadelain's research on "off-the-shelf" CAR T cells derived from induced pluripotent stem cells (iPSCs) is now being developed in a collaboration with Fate Therapeutics. His research with Dr. Prasad S. Adusumilli led to a collaboration with Atara Biotherapeutics, Inc. for a product candidate to treat malignant mesothelioma using mesothelin-targeted CAR T cells named icasM28z. In 2013, Sadelain co-founded Juno Therapeutics Inc.

Sadelain also designed lentiviral vectors encoding the β-globin gene for the treatment of severe hemoglobinopathies, which include β-thalassemia and sickle cell disease. The MSK team was the first to treat patients with β-thalassemia in the US. The history of the field and Sadelain's contributions are narrated in the 2021 George Stamatoyannopoulos Memorial Lecture at the annual meeting of the American Society of Gene and Cell Therapy.

== Patents ==
Sadelain holds numerous patents in immunotherapy. Sadelain is a named inventor on U.S. Patent No. 7446190B2 covering nucleic acids encoding chimeric T cell receptors. Sadelain is also named on patent U.S. Patent No. 10,370,452 covering compositions and uses of effector T cells expressing a chimeric antigen receptor (CAR), where such T cells are derived from a pluripotent stem cell including an induced pluripotent stem cell (iPSC). The patent is licensed for off-the-shelf, T-cell receptor (TCR)-less CD19 chimeric antigen receptor (CAR) T-cell product candidate known as FT819.

== Significant publications ==
- Krause, A; Guo, HF; Latouche, JB; Tan, C; Cheung, NK; Sadelain, M (1998). "Antigen-dependent CD28 signaling selectively enhances survival and proliferation in genetically modified activated human primary T lymphocytes". J Exp Med. 188 (4): 619–26. doi:10.1084/jem.188.4.619. PMC 2213361. PMID 9705944.
- May, C; Rivella, S; Callegari, J; Heller, G; Gaensler, KM; Luzzatto, L; Sadelain, M (2000). "Therapeutic haemoglobin synthesis in beta-thalassaemic mice expressing lentivirus-encoded human beta-globin". Nature. 406 (6791): 82–6. Bibcode:2000Natur.406...82M. doi:10.1038/35017565. PMID 10894546.
- Maher, J; Brentjens, RJ; Gunset, G; Rivière, I; Sadelain, M (2002). "Human T-lymphocyte cytotoxicity and proliferation directed by a single chimeric TCRzeta /CD28 receptor". Nat Biotechnol. 20 (1): 70–5. doi:10.1038/nbt0102-70. PMID 11753365.
- Brentjens, Renier J.; Latouche, Jean-Baptiste; Santos, Elmer; Marti, Francesc; Gong, Michael C.; Lyddane, Clay; King, Philip D.; Larson, Steven; Weiss, Mark; Rivière, Isabelle; Sadelain, Michel (2003). "Eradication of systemic B-cell tumors by genetically targeted human T lymphocytes co-stimulated by CD80 and interleukin-15". Nature Medicine. 9 (3): 279–286. doi:10.1038/nm827. PMID 12579196.
- Hollyman, D; Stefanski, J; Przybylowski, M; Bartido, S; Borquez-Ojeda, O; Taylor, C; Yeh, R; Capacio, V; Olszewska, M; Hosey, J; Sadelain, M; Brentjens, RJ; Rivière, I (2009). "Manufacturing validation of biologically functional T cells targeted to CD19 antigen for autologous adoptive cell therapy". J Immunother. 32 (2): 169–80. doi:10.1097/CJI.0b013e318194a6e8. PMC 2683970. PMID 19238016.
- Brentjens, Renier J.; Rivière, Isabelle; Park, Jae H.; Davila, Marco L.; Wang, Xiuyan; Stefanski, Jolanta; Taylor, Clare; Yeh, Raymond; Bartido, Shirley; Borquez-Ojeda, Oriana; Olszewska, Malgorzata; Bernal, Yvette; Pegram, Hollie; Przybylowski, Mark; Hollyman, Daniel; Usachenko, Yelena; Pirraglia, Domenick; Hosey, James; Santos, Elmer; Halton, Elizabeth; Maslak, Peter; Scheinberg, David; Jurcic, Joseph; Heaney, Mark; Heller, Glenn; Frattini, Mark; Sadelain, Michel (2011). "Safety and persistence of adoptively transferred autologous CD19-targeted T cells in patients with relapsed or chemotherapy refractory B-cell leukemias". Blood. 118 (18): 4817–4828. doi:10.1182/blood-2011-04-348540. PMC 3208293. PMID 21849486.
- Brentjens, RJ; Davila, ML; Riviere, I; Park, J; Wang, X; Cowell, LG; Bartido, S; Stefanski, J; Taylor, C; Olszewska, M; Borquez-Ojeda, O; Qu, J; Wasielewska, T; He, Q; Bernal, Y; Rijo, IV; Hedvat, C; Kobos, R; Curran, K; Steinherz, P; Jurcic, J; Rosenblat, T; Maslak, P; Frattini, M; Sadelain, M (2013). "CD19-targeted T cells rapidly induce molecular remissions in adults with chemotherapy-refractory acute lymphoblastic leukemia". Sci Transl Med. 5 (177): 177ra38. doi:10.1126/scitranslmed.3005930. PMC 3742551. PMID 23515080.
- Themeli, M; Kloss, CC; Ciriello, G; Fedorov, VD; Perna, F; Gonen, M; Sadelain, M (2013). "Generation of tumor-targeted human T lymphocytes from induced pluripotent stem cells for cancer therapy". Nat Biotechnol. 31 (10): 928–33. doi:10.1038/nbt.2678. PMC 5722218. PMID 23934177.
- Davila, ML; Riviere, I; Wang, X; Bartido, S; Park, J; Curran, K; Chung, SS; Stefanski, J; Borquez-Ojeda, O; Olszewska, M; Qu, J; Wasielewska, T; He, Q; Fink, M; Shinglot, H; Youssif, M; Satter, M; Wang, Y; Hosey, J; Quintanilla, H; Halton, E; Bernal, Y; Bouhassira, DC; Arcila, ME; Gonen, M; Roboz, GJ; Maslak, P; Douer, D; Frattini, MG; Giralt, S; Sadelain, M; Brentjens, R (2014). "Efficacy and toxicity management of 19-28z CAR T cell therapy in B cell acute lymphoblastic leukemia". Sci Transl Med. 6 (224): 224ra25. doi:10.1126/scitranslmed.3008226. PMC 4684949. PMID 24553386.
- Eyquem, J; Mansilla-Soto, J; Giavridis, T; van der Stegen, SJ; Hamieh, M; Cunanan, KM; Odak, A; Gönen, M; Sadelain, M (2017). "Targeting a CAR to the TRAC locus with CRISPR/Cas9 enhances tumour rejection". Nature. 543 (7643): 113–117. Bibcode:2017Natur.543..113E. doi:10.1038/nature21405. PMC 5558614. PMID 28225754.
- Park, JH; Rivière, I; Gonen, M; Wang, X; Sénéchal, B; Curran, KJ; Sauter, C; Wang, Y; Santomasso, B; Mead, E; Roshal, M; Maslak, P; Davila, M; Brentjens, RJ; Sadelain, M (2018). "Long-Term Follow-up of CD19 CAR Therapy in Acute Lymphoblastic Leukemia". N Engl J Med. 378 (5): 449–459. doi:10.1056/NEJMoa1709919. PMC 6637939. PMID 29385376..
- Dunbar, CE; High, KA; Joung, JK; Kohn, DB; Ozawa, K; Sadelain, M (2018). "Gene therapy comes of age". Science. 359 (6372) eaan4672. Bibcode:2018Sci...359n4672D. doi:10.1126/science.aan4672. PMID 29326244..

== Memberships ==
- CRI Accelerator Leadership
- The American Society for Clinical Investigation
- American Association for Cancer Research (AACR)
- American Society for Clinical Investigation (ASCI)
- American Society of Gene and Cell Therapy (ASGCT)
- American Society of Hematology (ASH)
- American Academy of Arts & Sciences
- National Academy of Medicine of France

== Awards ==
- 2012 William B. Coley Award
- 2013 Sultan Bin Khalifa International Thalassemia Award
- 2018 Passano Laureate and Physician Scientist Award
- 2018 Pasteur-Weizmann/Servier Prize Laureate
- 2019 Jacob and Louise Gabbay Award in Biotechnology and Medicine
- 2019 INSERM International Prize
- 2020 Leopold Griffuel Award
- 2021 ASGCT Outstanding Achievement Award
- 2023 Clarivate Citation Laureates
- 2023/24 Meyenburg Prize
- 2024 Breakthrough Prize in Life Sciences
- 2024 Canada Gairdner International Award
- 2024 Warren Alpert Foundation Prize
- 2024 VinFuture Prize
- 2025 King Faisal Prize
- 2025 Merkin Prize
- 2025 Broermann Medical Innovation Award
- 2025 BBVA Foundation Frontiers of Knowledge Award in the category "Biology and Biomedizin" jointly with Carl H. June.
- 2026 Tang Prize in the category "Biopharmaceutical Science".
