= Juan Abarca Campal =

Spanish physician and surgeon

Doctor Juan Abarca Campal
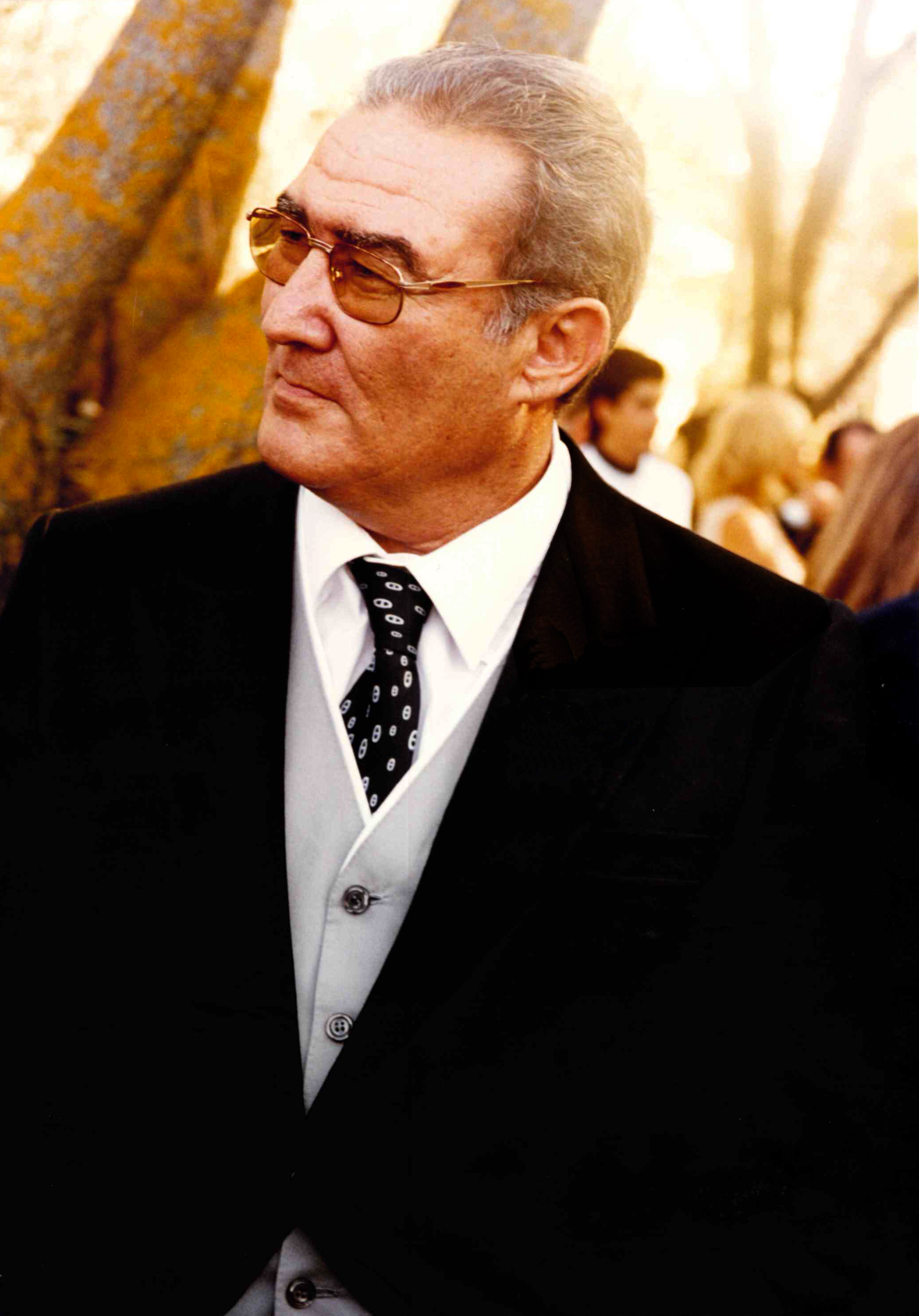
- Born: October 25, 1944 (age 81); Ciudad Rodrigo, Salamanca, Spain
- Education: University of Salamanca
- Occupations: Surgeon and entrepreneur
- Known for: HM Hospitales Founder, Abarca Prize
- Spouse: Doctora Carmen Cidón Tamargo
- Awards: Grand Cross of the Madrid Health System, 2008

Juan Abarca Campal (born October 25, 1944, Ciudad Rodrigo) is a Spanish physician and surgeon, businessman and founder of the HM Hospitales group.

== Biography ==
He lived a happy childhood in the middle of the post-war period, although full of small accidents. This brought him closer to traumatology, which was practiced by his cousin Ernesto, whom he accompanied in his first interventions. His mother wanted him to be a doctor and his father a military man, and throughout his life he achieved both professions, combining his responsibilities as a civilian and military doctor.

He studied Medicine and Surgery at the University of Salamanca, obtaining his doctorate in Hepatobiliary and Pancreatic Surgery with outstanding cum laude. After completing his medical studies, he sat the competitive examinations for Military Doctor of the Air Force, which led him to join the Air Health Corps. He was stationed at the 'La Virgen del Camino' Air Base in León, one year at the Air Hospital in Madrid and twenty-five years at the Hispano-American Air Base in Torrejón. He is a lieutenant colonel on leave.

His training was completed after practicing as a Resident and Assistant Physician in General Surgery at the La Paz University Residence (1970–77), alongside Dr. Fernández de Lis; and he was also a volunteer assistant to Dr. Carlos Moreno, of the Jimenez Díaz Foundation.

Seeking the greatest possible freedom in the performance of his profession, he sat and passed the competitive examinations for Social Security as a 'quota' surgeon, a term used to designate surgeons who could work independently. He was head of the General Surgery team in Social Security from 1977 to 1995. He was one of the pioneers of pancreas, liver, and biliary tract surgery, and performed his first total pancreas removal in 1978.

Until 1995 he worked as a specialist in General Surgery and Digestive System Medicine in the main medical societies in Madrid, mutual and collaborating societies.

In 1979 he founded the 'Tertulias Médicas', a forum for knowledge and dissemination that was organized until 1992. These were clinical sessions that became a point of reference among medical professionals of the time.

In 1989, together with his wife, also a physician, Carmen Cidón Tamargo, he founded HM Hospitales, which he chaired until 2016, when he was replaced by his son, Juan Abarca Cidón. Since 2021, the HM Hospitales Research Foundation has been awarding the Doctor Juan Abarca International Medical Sciences Prize, known as the Abarca Prize, in recognition of his medical and informative work.

He is the author of several scientific articles: 'Alterations of Plasma Proteins in Gastric Neoplasias', 'Aortic Stenosis', 'Hereditary Telangiectasias of the colon', 'Surgical anomalies of the angle of Treitz', 'Argumosa: life and surgical work', 'Evaluation of the D'Or Technique in esophageal hernias' and 'Total Duodenopancreatectomies (personal experience 11 cases)'.

He is a member of the Spanish Society of Digestive System, the Spanish Society of General Surgery and the International College of Surgeons.

== Awards and recognition ==
- Pro Ecclesia et Pontifice Cross, awarded by Pope John Paul II, 2005.
- Award for business excellence from the Confederation of Business Associations of West Madrid (CADEMO), 2007.
- Gran Cruz de la Sanidad Madrileña, 2008.
- 2011 Dirigentes Award for Business Career.
- Medical Economics Award for Professional Career Achievement, 2012.

== Publications ==
- A Hospital Model. Edited by Profesionales de la Medicina y la Empresa S.A. 2001. Foreword by Juan Abarca Campal.
- Five liters of blood. Memoirs of a surgeon and businessman in private medicine. J de J Editores, 2007.
