= Rudy Ballieux =

Dutch immunologist (1930–2020)

- Born: Rudolf Eugène Pierre Albertus Ballieux; 17 September 1930; Pekalongan, Dutch East Indies
- Died: 22 October 2020 (aged 90); Doorn, Netherlands
- Occupation: Immunologist

Rudolf Eugène Pierre Albertus "Rudy" Ballieux (17 September 1930 – 22 October 2020) was a Dutch immunologist.

== Career ==
Ballieux was born on 17 September 1930 in Pekalongan in the Dutch East Indies. After attending the Hogere Burgerschool he studied chemistry and medical science at Utrecht University. He earned his doctor title in 1963 under F.L.J. Jordan.

Ballieux was professor of Clinical Immunology at Utrecht University between 1977 and 1991. He subsequently served another four years as Bijzonder hoogleraar of Psychoimmunophysiology, a bijzonder hoogleraar being a professor paid for by external funds, in his case the Utrecht University Fund. In the later part of his career Ballieux did research on the influence of stress on the immune system.

Ballieux was the first Van Loghem Laureate lecturer of the Dutch Society for Immunology in 1981. He was elected a member of the Royal Netherlands Academy of Arts and Sciences in 1991. Among his most notable students was stem cell biologist Hans Clevers.

He died in Doorn on 22 October 2020, aged 90.
