= Rhön-Klinikum =

Rhön-Klinikum AG
- Company type: Aktiengesellschaft
- Traded as: FWB: RHK
- Industry: Health care
- Founded: 1973
- Headquarters: Bad Neustadt an der Saale, Germany
- Key people: Stephan Holzinger (CEO and chairman of the management board), Eugen Münch (Chairman of the supervisory board)
- Services: Private hospitals and health centres
- Revenue: €2.550 billion (2010)
- Operating income: €197.9 million (2010)
- Net income: €139.7 million (2010)
- Total assets: €3.058 billion (2010)
- Total equity: €1.495 billion (2010)
- Number of employees: 38,060 (end 2010)
- Website: rhoen-klinikum-ag.com

Rhön-Klinikum is a German cooperation of hospitals and clinics headquartered in Bad Neustadt an der Saale, Germany. It is a leading private hospital group in Germany.

== Recent news ==
Founder Eugen Münch tried to sell Rhön-Klinikum to rival Fresenius in 2012 but German billionaire Bernard Broermann, fearing a dominant rival to his hospital chain Asklepios Kliniken, amassed a big enough stake in Rhön to block the deal. The firm still sold most of its hospitals to Fresenius in September 2013 for around $4.1 billion.

In 2020, Asklepios Kliniken, which already held 28.7% of Rhön's shares at the time, announced plans to initially buy a 12.4% stake from Münch. The two would then pool Münch's remaining stake of 7.6% in Rhön with shares held by Asklepios. As a result, their joint investment company would hold at least 49% in Rhön.
