= University Hospital of Giessen and Marburg =

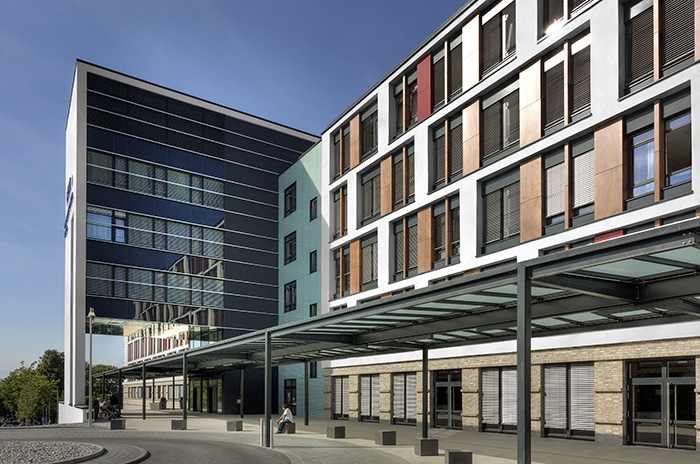
- Giessen site

Geography
- Location: Giessen and Marburg, Germany
- Coordinates: 50°48′53″N 8°48′21″E

Organisation
- Type: Teaching
- Affiliated university: University of Giessen and University of Marburg

Links
- Lists: Hospitals in Germany

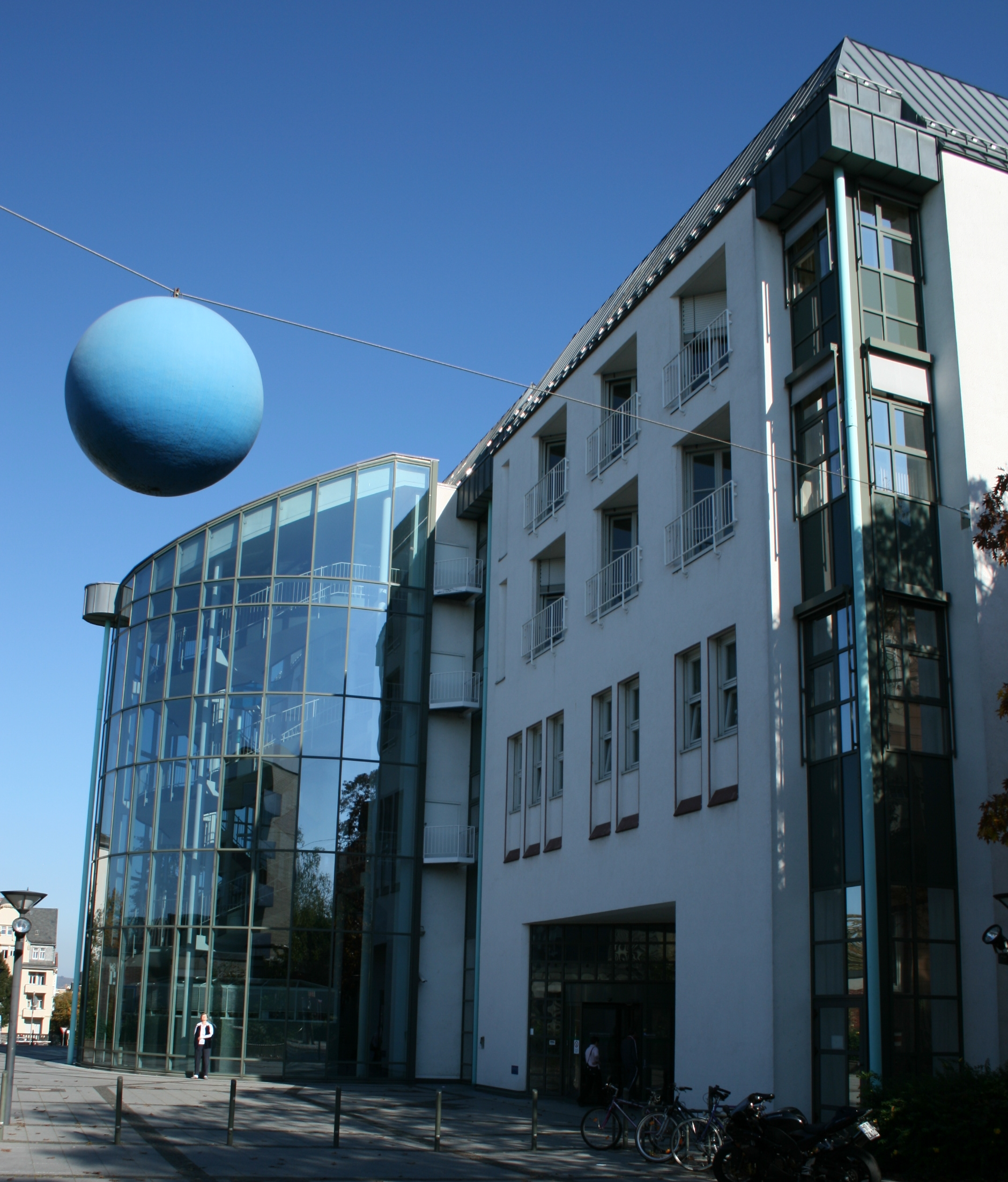
Surgery building, Giessen site

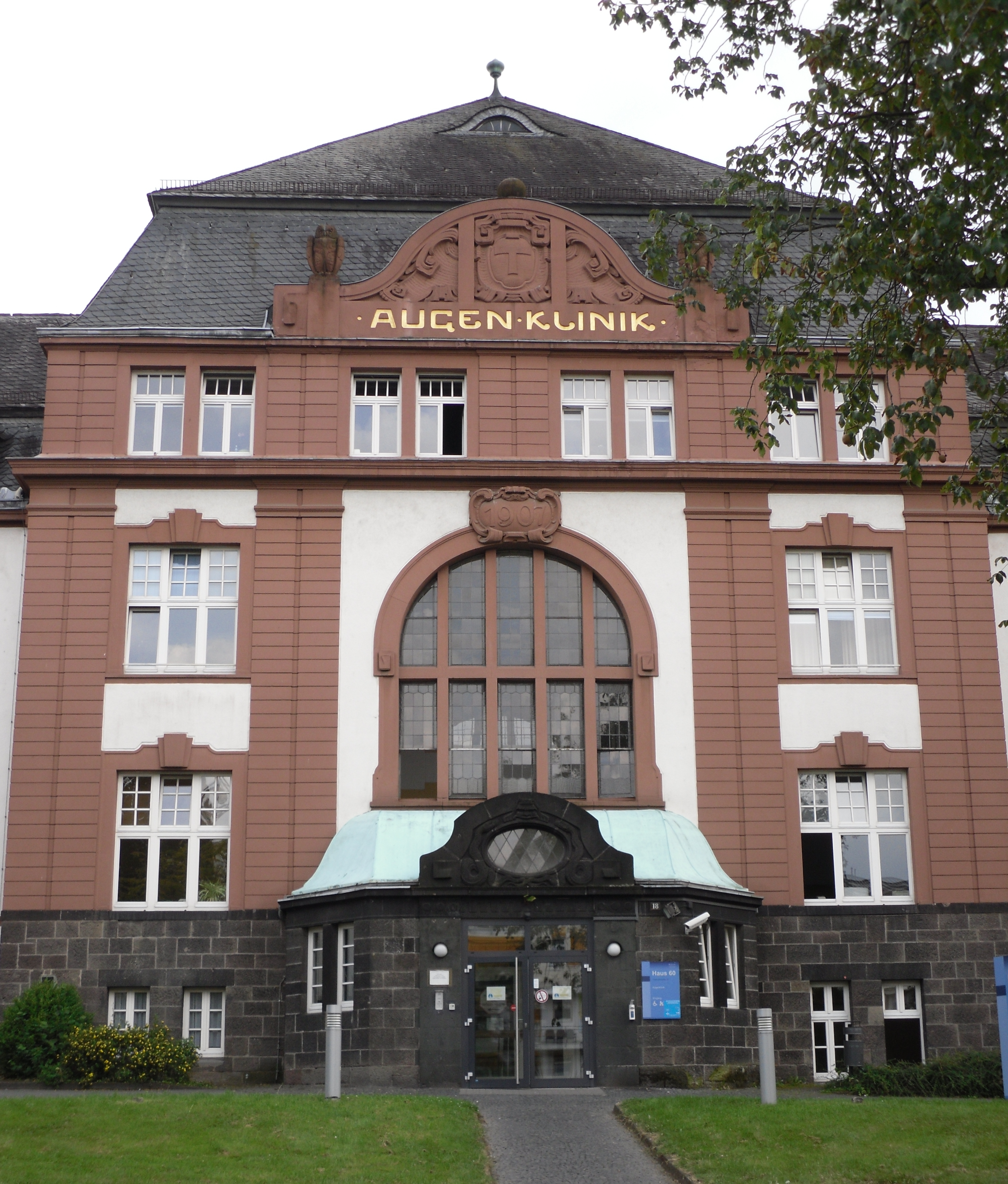
Eye clinic, Giessen site

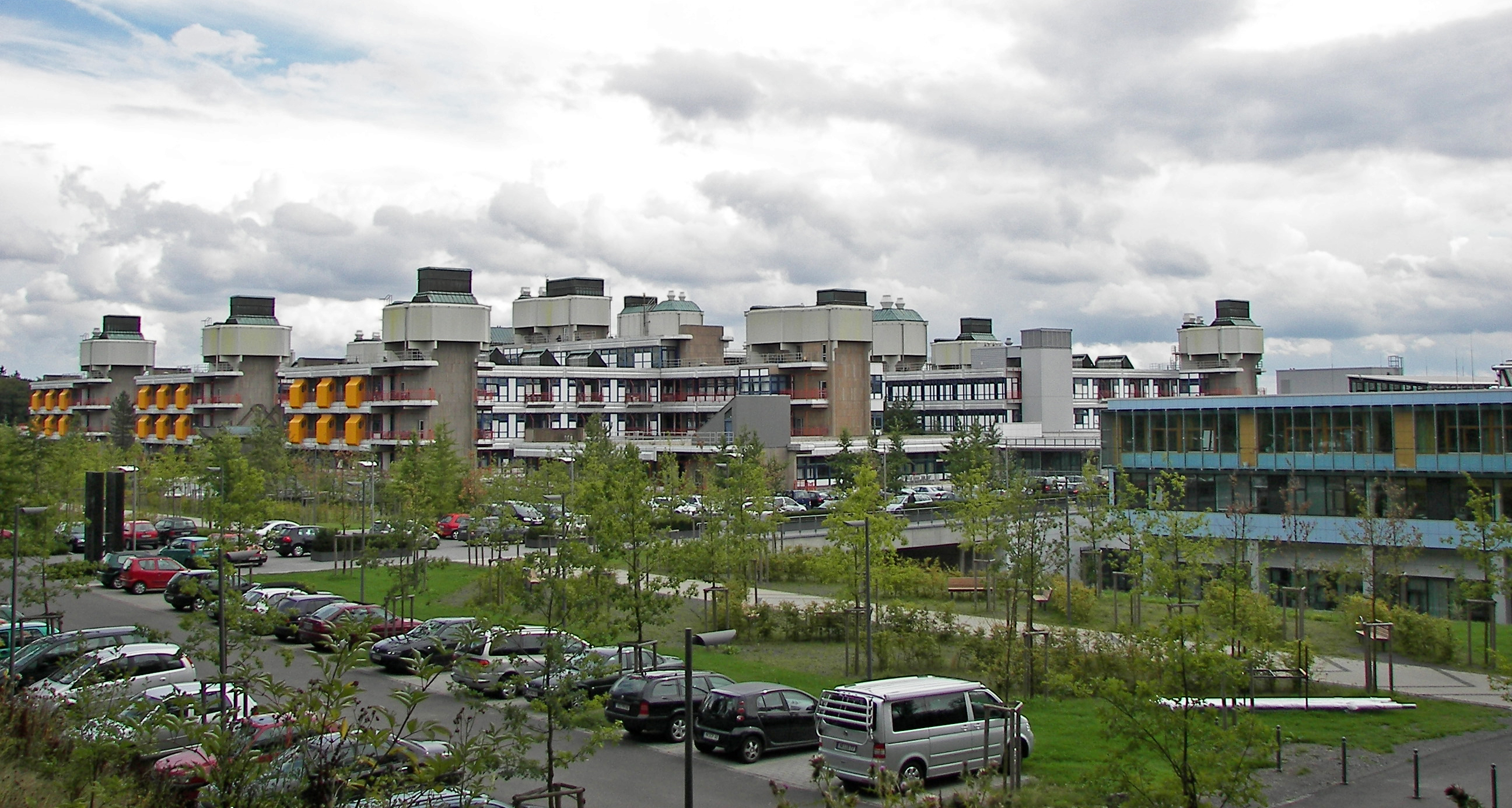
Marburg site

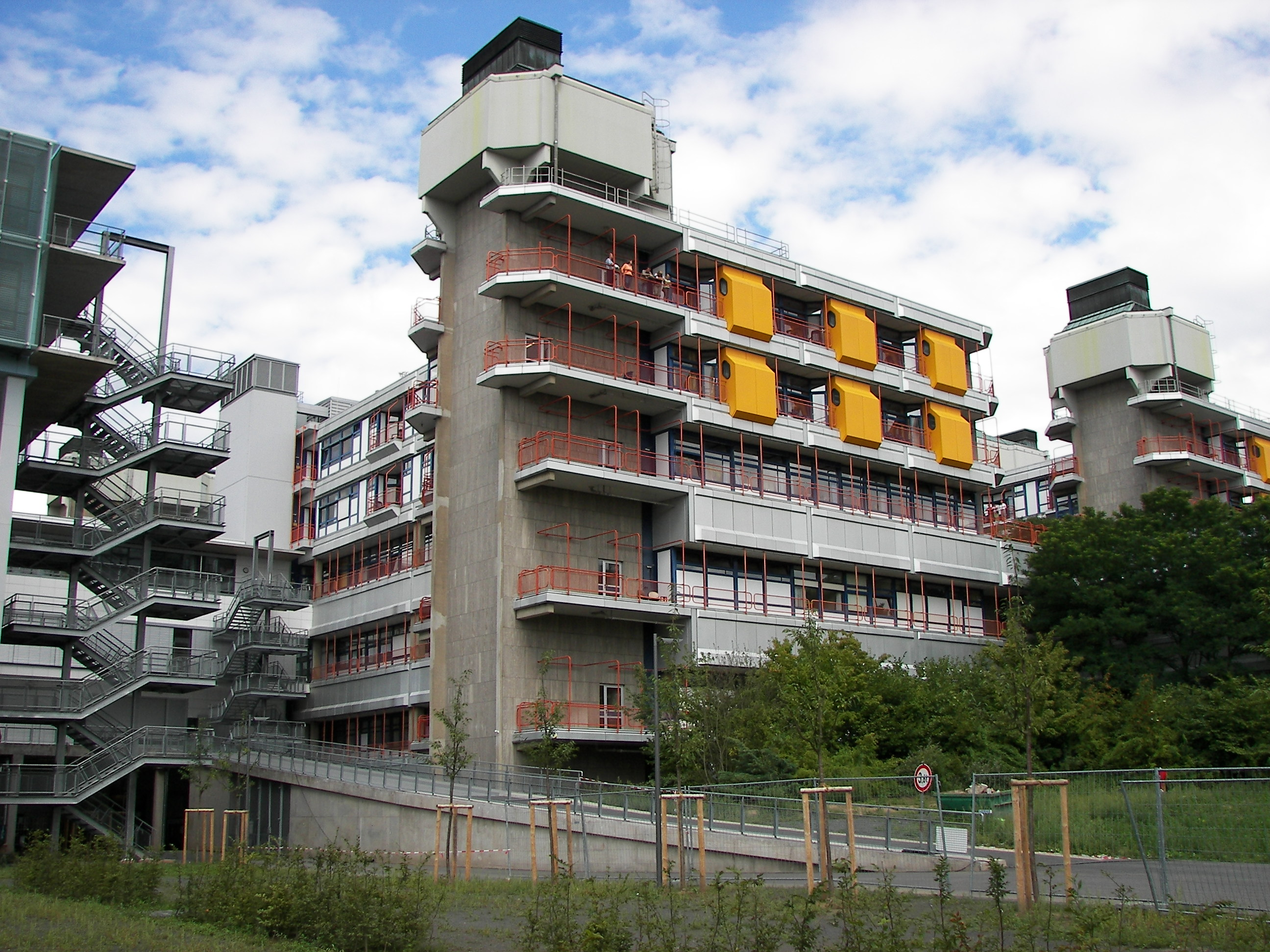
Marburg site, southern part of main building

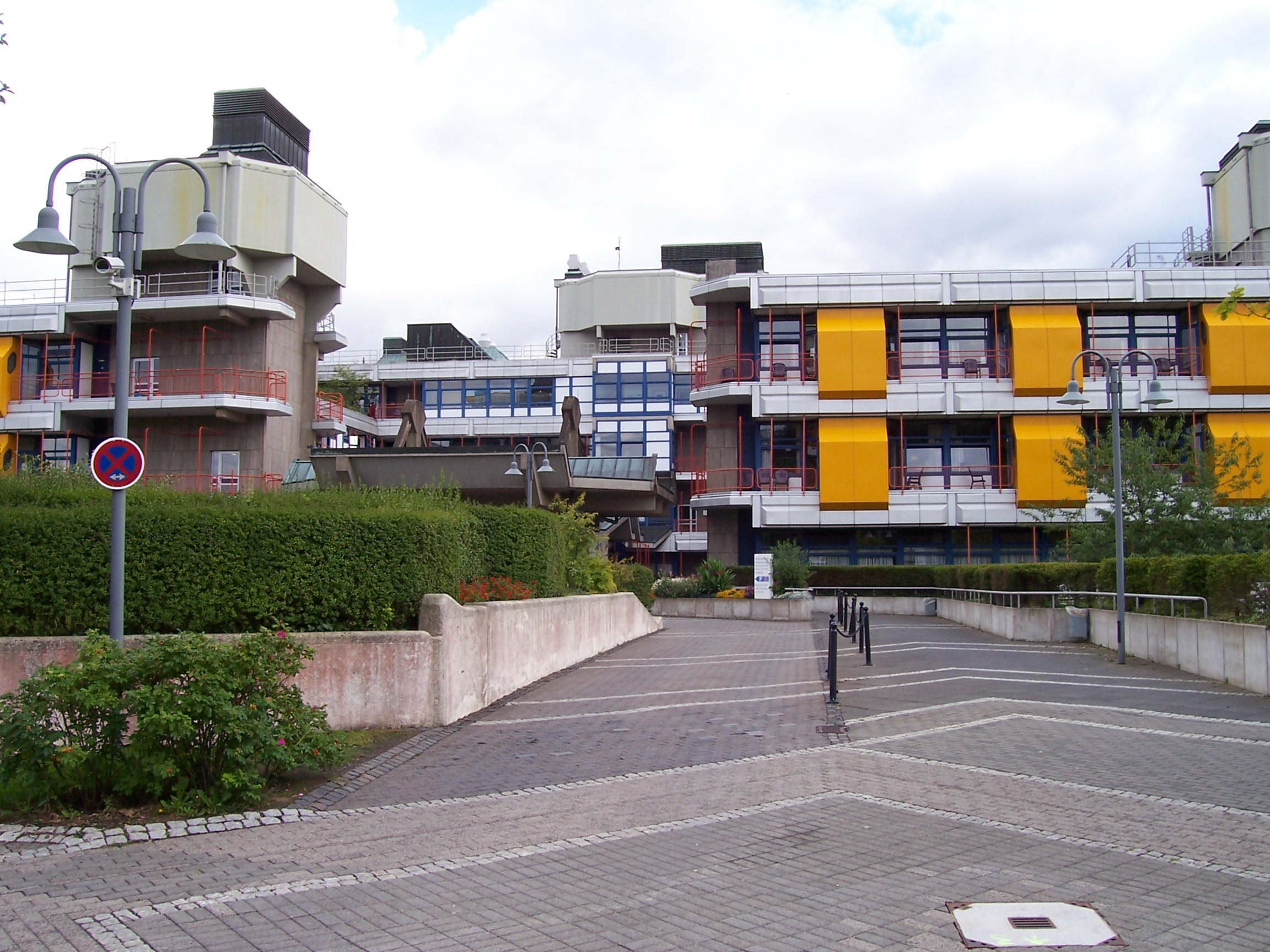
entry of Marburg site

The University Hospital of Giessen and Marburg (Universitätsklinikum Gießen und Marburg GmbH) (UKGM) is a German university hospital of the Rhön-Klinikum. It is based in Giessen and Marburg; the Giessen site is the teaching hospital of the University of Giessen whereas the Marburg site is the teaching hospital of the University of Marburg. It is the first privatized university hospital in Germany and, due to the merger of the two sites, one of the largest hospitals in Germany. In total it has 2,285 beds, thereof 1,145 in Giessen and 1,140 in Marburg.
