= Constance Scharff =

German zoologist and neuroethologist

Constance Scharff (born 1959) is a German zoologist and neuroethologist and Professor at the Free University of Berlin. She is particularly notable for her research on birdsong, neurogenesis and regeneration.

== Early life and education ==
Scharff went to school in Lübeck, Germany and moved to Marburg, Germany, to study biology in 1979. She went on to study experimental neurobiology and neuroethology at Adelphi university in New York with Carol Diakow. From 1984, she worked with Fernando Nottebohm at Rockefeller University where she earned her degree of Ph.D. Studying bird song, the researchers were involved in a series of studies that showed the generation of new neurons in the adult brain. These findings contradicted the then-established view that the brain was equipped with a fixed number of neurons at the time of birth. She moved to Paris in 1991, where she worked at the Institut d'Embryology Cellulaire et Moléculaire. She returned to New York as a postdoctoral associate to work with Nottebohm again in 1994. She was a group leader at the Max Planck institute for Molecular Genetics in Berlin from 2001 to 2005 before she became a professor at the Free University of Berlin in 2005.

== Work ==
Scharff studies birdsong in canaries and zebra finches. Here, her work is concerned with mechanisms of learning in acoustic communication and the neural pathways that control it. Further, her work focusses on the control of neuronal regeneration and replacement in adult birds. She was also involved in the decoding of the zebra finch genome. Her research suggested an important role of the gene FOXP2 in sound learning in both birds and humans, leading to a potential better understanding of hereditary disorders of speech.

Since 2012, Scharff is a member of the Berlin-Brandenburg Academy of Sciences and Humanities.

In 2019 she became a member of the German Academy of Sciences Leopoldina.

== Personal life ==
Scharff has two daughters with microbiologist Arturo Zychlinsky.
