= Douglas A. Melton =

American medical researcher

Doug Melton
- Born: Douglas A. Melton
- Education: University of Illinois at Urbana–Champaign (BS); University of Cambridge (BA, PhD)
- Known for: Research on cure for type 1 diabetes
- Awards: George Ledlie Prize; Richard Lounsbery Award (1995); Eliot P. Joslin Medal; NAS member (1995); Marshall Scholarship
- Scientific career
- Fields: Stem cells; Developmental biology
- Workplaces: Harvard University; Howard Hughes Medical Institute
- Thesis: The expression of transfer RNA genes to other DNAs microinjected into Xenopus oocytes (1979)
- Doctoral advisor: John Gurdon
- Notable students: Richard P. Harvey (postdoc); Clifford Tabin (postdoc)
- Website: www.scrb.harvard.edu/lab/50/home; hsci.harvard.edu/people/douglas-melton-phd

Douglas A. Melton is an American medical researcher who was the Xander University Professor at Harvard University and an investigator at the Howard Hughes Medical Institute until 2022. Melton was a co-director of the Harvard Stem Cell Institute and was an original co-chairman (with David Scadden) of the Harvard University Department of Stem Cell and Regenerative Biology. Melton was involved in the founding of several biotech companies including Gilead Sciences, Ontogeny (now Curis), iPierian (now True North Therapeutics), and Semma Therapeutics. Melton is a member of the National Academy of the Sciences, the American Academy of Arts and Sciences, and is a founding member of the International Society for Stem Cell Research.

After decades teaching at Harvard, he left in 2022 to work at Vertex Pharmaceuticals full-time.

== Early life and education ==
Melton grew up in Blue Island, Illinois and completed a Bachelor of Science degree in biology at the University of Illinois at Urbana–Champaign in 1975. He was awarded a Marshall Scholarship for study at the University of Cambridge where he received a Bachelor of Arts degree in the history and philosophy of science in 1977 and a PhD under the supervision of John Gurdon.

== Career and research ==
Melton's early work was in general developmental biology, identifying genes important for cell fate determination and body pattern. This led to the finding that the nervous system in vertebrates is formed as a default when early embryonic cells do not receive inductive signals to become mesoderm or endoderm. He also pioneered the technique of in vitro transcription with bacterial SP6 RNA polymerase. This RNA transcription system is now widely used to make large amounts of messenger RNAs in vitro and is, for example, the basis for production of the COVID mRNA vaccines.

In the mid-1990s, work in his lab became centered on the development of the pancreas aiming to find new treatments for diabetes.

In 2001 when President George W. Bush cut federal funding of embryonic stem cell research, Melton used private donations to create 17 published human stem cell lines and distributed them without charge to researchers around the world.

In August 2008, Melton's lab published successful in vivo reprogramming of adult mice exocrine pancreatic cells into insulin secreting cells which closely resembled endogenous islet beta cells of the pancreas in terms of their size, shape, ultrastructure, and essential marker genes. Unlike producing beta cells from conventional embryonic stem cells or the more recently developed induced pluripotent stem cell (iPSC) technique, Melton's method involved direct cell reprogramming of an adult cell type (exocrine cell) into other adult cell type (beta cell) without reversion to a pluripotent stem cell state.

His current research interests include pancreatic developmental biology and the directed differentiation of human embryonic stem cells, particularly in pertinence to type 1 diabetes. In 2014, he reported a method using human pluripotent stem cells to generate virtually unlimited quantities of functional insulin-producing beta cells that respond appropriately to a glucose challenge.

In 2022, Melton left Harvard University and joined Vertex Pharmaceuticals full-time to create diabetes treatments.

== Awards and honors ==
Melton was elected a member of the National Academy of Sciences and the American Academy of Arts and Sciences in 1995. In 2007 and again in 2009, Melton was listed among the Time 100 Most Influential People in the World. In 2016, Melton was awarded the Ogawa-Yamanaka Prize in Stem Cell Biology. In 2023 he received the Abarca Prize for his advances towards a cure for diabetes.
