= Hans Clevers =

Dutch molecular genetics and stem cell researcher

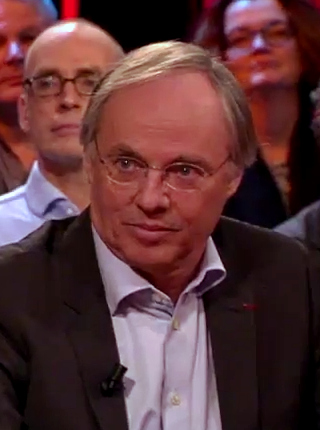
- Clevers in 2018
- Born: Johannes Carolus Clevers; 27 March 1957 (age 69); Eindhoven, Netherlands
- Education: Utrecht University
- Known for: Organoid generation and application
- Spouse: Eefke Petersen
- Children: 2
- Awards: Louis-Jeantet Prize for Medicine; Breakthrough Prize in Life Sciences; Dr A. H. Heineken Prize for Medicine; Körber European Science Prize
- Scientific career
- Fields: Molecular genetics Cell biology
- Workplaces: Roche; Princess Máxima Center; University Medical Center Utrecht; Hubrecht Institute for Developmental Biology and Stem Cell Research; Utrecht University; Dana–Farber Cancer Institute
- Thesis: Early events in lymphocyte activation (1985)
- Doctoral advisor: Rudy Ballieux

Johannes (Hans) Carolus Clevers (born 27 March 1957) is a Dutch molecular geneticist, cell biologist and stem cell researcher. He became the Head of Pharma, Research and Early Development, and a member of the Corporate Executive Committee, of the Swiss healthcare company Roche in 2022. Previously, he headed a research group at the Hubrecht Institute for Developmental Biology and Stem Cell Research and at the Prinses Máxima Centrum; he remained as an advisor and guest scientist or visiting researcher to both groups. He is also a Professor in Molecular Genetics at Utrecht University.

== Early life and education ==
Hans Clevers was born in Eindhoven, the Netherlands in 1957. He began studying biology at Utrecht University in 1975, but also started taking medicine in 1978, in part due to his interest and in part because his friends and brothers were in the medical profession. He spent 1 year in Nairobi, Kenya, and half a year at the National Institutes of Health in Bethesda, United States, for biology rotations. He received a Doctoraal (equivalent to an MSc) in Biology in 1982 and an Artsexamen (equivalent to an MD) in 1984. Mostly because of his research background, Clevers was selected for a training position in paediatrics, and then went to pursue a PhD in 1985, under the supervision of Rudy Ballieux. He obtained his PhD 1 year later.

== Career ==
After his PhD, Clevers went to the Dana–Farber Cancer Institute as a postdoctoral researcher at Cox Terhorst's group. In 1989, he returned to the Netherlands, joining his alma mater, Utrecht University, as an assistant professor at the Department of Clinical Immunology.

In 1991, Clevers became a professor and the chair of the Department of Immunology at Utrecht University. He moved to the University Medical Center Utrecht in 2002 as a professor in molecular genetics, and started his lab at the Hubrecht Institute for Developmental Biology and Stem Cell Research (Hubrecht Institute). At the same time, he took up the position of Director of the Hubrecht Institute.

In March 2012, Clevers was elected the president of the Royal Netherlands Academy of Arts and Sciences, succeeding Robbert Dijkgraaf. His term concluded in 2015, and he started another lab at the Princess Máxima Center, focusing on childhood cancer, and became the Director Research and Chief Scientific Officer there until 2019.

Clevers left University Medical Center Utrecht and was appointed Professor in Molecular Genetics at Utrecht University in 2020.

After serving as member of the Supervisory Committee of the Swiss healthcare company Roche from 2019 onwards, Clevers joined as Head of Pharma, Research and Early Development and a member of its Corporate Executive Committee. He retired from this position at the end of 2025 and returned to Utrecht to continue the supervision of his research groups at the Princess Máxima Center and Hubrecht Institute.

Since 2017, Clevers is an investigator at the Oncode Institute in Utrecht.

Clevers has served at a number of scientific organizations, including on the board of directors of the American Association for Cancer Research (2013–2016), and the Scientific Advisory Board of the Swiss Institute for Experimental Cancer Research at the École Polytechnique Fédérale de Lausanne (2005–2015), the Research Institute of Molecular Pathology in Vienna (2015–2021) and the Francis Crick Institute in London. He is currently on the advisory board of various scientific journals, including The EMBO Journal, Disease Models & Mechanisms, Cell, Cell Stem Cell and EMBO Molecular Medicine. From 2014 to 2022, he was also on the editorial committee of the Annual Review of Cancer Biology.

Outside the academia, Clevers has been a scientific advisor to numerous biotechnology companies. He also co-founded California-based Surrozen in 2016 and Shanghai-based D1 Medical Technology in 2019.

Hans Clevers interviewed for the Dutch television show The Mind of the Universe

== Research ==
Clevers's early career focused on the Wnt signaling pathway. His group identified the TCF1 protein, a member of the TCF gene family and a crucial downstream component of the Wnt signaling pathway, making it central in immune responses, embryonic development and tissue repair. His interest in the gastrointestinal tract began with the discovery that another TCF family member, the TCF4 protein, is required in forming intestinal crypts. Collaborating with Bert Vogelstein, he found that in colon cancer where the APC gene is doubly mutated, TCF family members activate catenin beta-1, which then enhances the expression of many genes that cause cancer transformation, connecting the Wnt signaling pathway with colon cancer.

In 2007, Clevers's group identified a marker for stem cells of the small and large intestines, LGR5, itself also a target of the Wnt signaling pathway. This led to his finding that LGR5 is a stem cell marker in other organs as well, including the stomach and hair follicles.

Building on this discovery, in 2009, his group published a landmark paper, describing for the first time how organoids, which are 3-dimensional in vitro structures that behave anatomically and molecularly like the organ from which they are derived, were generated from adult stem cells, creating organoids of the small intestine. Clevers's group has applied this technology to culturing organoids from multiple other organs, such as the stomach and liver, as well as from various cancer types, including cancer of the breast and the ovaries. This platform has since been applied in personalized medicine, by generating organoids from specific patients to screen for drugs. This is not limited to cancer but is applicable to other diseases as well (for example, cystic fibrosis). His current major research interest is in using organoids derived from adult stem cells to study the molecular mechanism of tissue and cancer development.

During the COVID-19 pandemic, Clevers's group modelled the infection of SARS-CoV-2 using lung organoids.

== Honours and awards ==
- Member of the European Molecular Biology Organization (1999)
- Member of the Royal Netherlands Academy of Arts and Sciences (2000)
- Spinoza Prize (2001)
- Louis-Jeantet Prize for Medicine (2004)
- Knight of the Legion of Honour (2005)
- Meyenburg Prize (2008)
- Member of Academia Europaea (2009)
- United European Gastroenterology Federation Research Prize (2010)
- Ernst Jung Prize for Medicine (2011)
- International Honorary Member of the American Academy of Arts and Sciences (2012)
- William Beaumont Prize (2012)
- Dr A.H. Heineken Prize for Medicine (2012)
- Knight of the Order of the Netherlands Lion (2012)
- Member of Koninklijke Hollandsche Maatschappij der Wetenschappen (2012)
- Breakthrough Prize in Life Sciences (2013)
- International Member of the National Academy of Sciences (2014)
- Fellow of the American Association for Cancer Research Academy
- Foreign Associate of the French Academy of Sciences (2015)
- Pour le Mérite (2016)
- Körber European Science Prize (2016)
- Knight Commander's Cross of the Order of Merit of the Federal Republic of Germany (2018)
- Foreign Member of the Royal Society (2019)
- Honorary Fellow of the Royal Society of Edinburgh (2019)
- Keio Medical Science Prize (2019)
- The Pezcoller Foundation-AACR International Award for Extraordinary Achievement in Cancer Research (2021)
- Abarca Prize, research into organoid technology, (2025)
