= Carl H. June =

American immunologist and oncologist

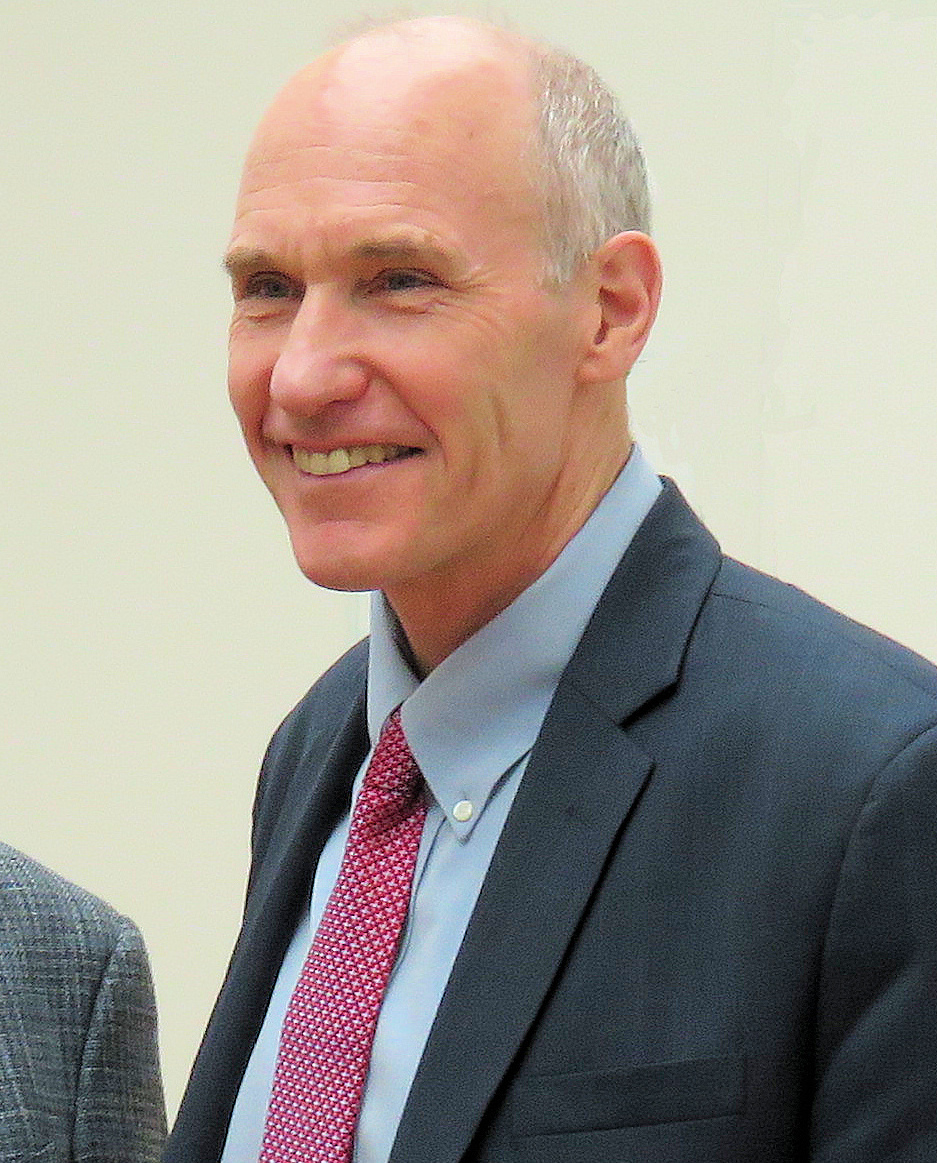
- June in 2015
- Born: 1953 (age 72–73)
- Education: US Naval Academy (B.S., 1975); Baylor College of Medicine M.D., 1979)
- Awards: Time 100; Breakthrough Prize in Life Sciences; Broermann Medical Innovation Award; Tang Prize
- Scientific career
- Fields: Immunology
- Workplaces: University of Pennsylvania; World Health Organization; Fred Hutchinson Cancer Center; Naval Medical Research Institute

Carl H. June (born 1953) is an American immunologist and oncologist. He is currently the Richard W. Vague Professor in Immunotherapy in the Department of Pathology and Laboratory Medicine at the Perelman School of Medicine of the University of Pennsylvania. He is most well known for his research on T cell therapies for the treatment of several forms of cancers. In 2020 he was elected to the American Philosophical Society.

== Education and career ==
June graduated from the US Naval Academy in 1975 and earned his medical degree in from the Baylor College of Medicine in 1979. He spent his fourth year of medical school at the World Health Organization in Geneva, Switzerland, studying immunology and malaria with Dr. Paul Henri-Lambert, and completed clinical training in internal medicine and medical oncology from 1979 to 1983 at the National Naval Medical Center in Bethesda, Maryland. June conducted postdoctoral research in transplantation biology with E. Donnall Thomas and John Hansen at the Fred Hutchinson Cancer Center in Seattle from 1983 to 1986. After completing his training, he returned to Bethesda, where he founded the Immune Cell Biology Program at the Naval Medical Research Center and was head of the department of immunology from 1990 to 1995. He was also a professor of medicine and of cell and molecular biology at the Uniformed Services University for the Health Sciences. In 1999 June joined the University of Pennsylvania as a professor of molecular and cellular engineering at the University of Pennsylvania's school of medicine and investigator at the Abramson Family Cancer Research Institute, where he remains today. He is board-certified in internal medicine and oncology.

== Research ==
June has been a pioneer in the field of immunotherapy, most widely known for the development of T-cell therapy for cancer. In the 1980s, his lab supported research for the CD28 molecule as the major control switch for T cells. A few years later, his lab tested the ability to culture genetically modified CAR-Ts in humans, discovering the cells could engraft and persist in patients with HIV/AIDS for years. His work led to the development and commercialization of tisagenlecleucel, the first FDA-approved cell therapy.

== Awards and honors ==
- 1978 – Alpha Omega Alpha Medical Society.
- 1978 – Michael E. DeBakey Scholar award for the Outstanding Medical Student, Baylor College of Medicine
- 1991 – Fellow, American College of Physicians.
- 1996 – Legion of Merit, US Navy
- 1996 – Dexter Conrad Award, Office of Naval Research, Navy’s highest award for Scientific Achievement
- 1997 – Frank Brown Berry Prize in Federal Medicine
- 2001 – Burroughs Wellcome Fund Award: visiting professor in the basic medical sciences
- 2002 – Lifetime Achievement Award, Leukemia and Lymphoma Society
- 2002 – William Osler Award, University of Pennsylvania School of Medicine
- 2005–09 – Bristol-Myers Squibb Freedom to Discover Award
- 2005 – Federal Laboratory Award for Excellence in Technology Transfer.
- 2012 – William B. Coley Award for Distinguished Research in Basic and Tumor Immunology
- 2012 – Ernest Beutler Lecture and Prize, American Society of Hematology
- 2012 – Elected to Institute of Medicine
- 2013 – The Philadelphia Award
- 2013 – Richard V Smalley Award, Society for Immunotherapy of Cancer
- 2014 – Elected to American Academy of Arts and Sciences.
- 2014 – Steinman Award for Human Immunology Research, American Association of Immunologists
- 2014 – Aubrey Evans Award / Ronald McDonald House
- 2014 – Karl Landsteiner Memorial Award, AABB.
- 2014 – Taubman Prize for Excellence in Translational Medical Science
- 2014 – Hamdan Award for Medical Research Excellence
- 2015 – Paul Ehrlich and Ludwig Darmstaedter Prize.
- 2015 – Watanabe Prize for Translational Research, Indiana University and Eli Lilly
- 2015 – Lifetime Achievement Award Lecture, Miami Winter Symposium
- 2015 – Debrecen Award for Molecular Medicine, University of Debrecen
- 2015 – AACR-CRI Lloyd J. Old Award in Cancer Immunology.
- 2015 – Award for Distinguished Research in the Biomedical Sciences, Association of American Medical Colleges
- 2015 – E. Donnall Thomas Award Lecture, American Society for Blood and Marrow Transplantation
- 2016 – John Scott Medal
- 2016 – Distinguished Graduate Award, U.S. Naval Academy.
- 2016 – Novartis Prize in Immunology
- 2016 – Clinical Research Achievement Award.
- 2017 – Karnofsky Prize, ASCO
- 2017 – Distinguished Scientist Award, Association of American Cancer Institutes
- 2018 – Time 100: The Most Influential People of 2018
- 2018 – Albany Medical Center Prize in Medicine and Biomedical Research.
- 2018 – Passano Prize
- 2019 – ACTS Distinguished Investigator: Translation from Proof-of-Concept to Applicability for Widespread Clinical Practice Award
- 2019 – Harrington Prize, American Society for Clinical Investigation
- 2019 – The Edward Netter Leadership Award, Alliance for Cancer Gene Therapy
- 2020 – Lorraine Cross Award
- 2020 – Elected member American Philosophical Society
- 2020 – Genome Valley Excellence Award, BioAsia
- 2020 – Elected member National Academy of Sciences
- 2021 – Dan David Prize
- 2021 – Outstanding Achievement Award, American Society of Gene & Cell Therapy
- 2022 – Keio Medical Science Prize
- 2022 – Maria I. New International Prize for Biomedical Research
- 2023 – Phacilitate Lifetime Achievement Award
- 2023 – Clarivate Citation Laureates
- 2024 – Breakthrough Prize in Life Sciences
- 2024 – Abarca Prize, for CAR-T cell therapy to fight blood cancer
- 2024 – VinFuture Prize, alongside Zelig Eshhar, and Michel Sadelain for the development and advancement of CAR T cell therapy.
- 2024 – Warren Alpert Foundation Prize
- 2025 – Balzan Prize
- 2025 – Broermann Medical Innovation Award
- 2025 – BBVA Foundation Frontiers of Knowledge Award in the category "Biology and Biomedizin" jointly with Michel Sadelain.
- 2026 – Tang Prize in the category "Biopharmaceutical Science".
