= Bernard Broermann =

German businessman and tax advisor (1943–2024)

Bernard Grosse Broermann
- Born: Bernard Grosse Broermann; 20 November 1943
- Died: 25 February 2024 (aged 80)
- Education: Harvard University, INSEAD
- Occupations: Founder, Asklepios Kliniken

Bernard Grosse Broermann (20 November 1943 – 25 February 2024) was a German billionaire businessman who was the founder of Asklepios Kliniken, one of Germany's three largest operators of private hospitals. It employs more than 68,000 people, and owns 170 healthcare facilities worldwide.

== Early life ==
Bernard Grosse Broermann grew up in Damme and studied medicine and chemistry in Berlin and Münster up to the respective preliminary examinations. He then switched to studying law and business administration and graduated with both legal state examinations and admission to the bar. He was awarded a doctorate in law in 1970 with his dissertation ‘The Scope of Investment Legislation’. During his studies, he founded the company, "Capital Treuhand", which was responsible for managing SEC-controlled funds. After completing his studies in Berlin, he sold this company. Broermann had an MBA from the INSEAD and Harvard University.

== Career ==
Before founding the organisation Asklepios, and his first hospital in 1984, Broermann worked as an accountant and lawyer before founding Asklepios and his first hospital in 1984.

Asklepios Kliniken has moved into luxury hotels with its subsidiary, Dr. Broermann Hotels & Residences GmbH, which has bought Hotel Atlantic Kempinski in Hamburg, the Kempinski Hotel Falkenstein in Königstein, a luxury hotel and spa in the Taunus region near Frankfurt, and the Villa Rothschild Kempinski near Frankfurt. In 2024, Asklepios had 68,000 employees. In 2018, Dr. Broermann Hotels & Residences GmbH also acquired the Grand Hôtel Suisse Majestic Montreux and the Fairmont Le Montreux Palace hotel complex in Switzerland.

As of February 2024, Forbes estimated his net worth at US$3.5 billion.

== Broermann Medical Innovation Award ==
The Broermann Medical Innovation Award was initiated in October 2024. The application phase began in January 2025 and it is to be awarded for the first time in the same year. The prize money amounts to one million euros.

Broermann gemeinnützige GmbH acts as the benefactor of the award, while the award ceremony is organised by the University Hospital of Giessen and Marburg. The award committee is made up of professors from the universities of Giessen and Marburg, supplemented by representatives from the Max Planck Society, the Fraunhofer Society and the Leibniz Association as well as a representative from Asklepios.

== Personal life and death ==
Broermann was married with three children and lived in Königstein, Germany. He died on 25 February 2024, at the age of 80.
