= Asklepios Kliniken =

Major hospital operator primarily active in Germany

- Type: Private
- Industry: Private Hospitals
- Founded: 1985
- Founder: Bernard Broermann
- Headquarters: Hamburg, Germany
- Key people: Joachim Gemmel, Marco Walker, Sara Sheikhzadeh
- Operating income: €5.96 billion (2024)
- Number of employees: 50,904 (2024)
- Website: asklepios.com/en/group

Asklepios Kliniken are a major hospital operator primarily active in Germany, with their headquarters in Hamburg. They are one of the largest hospital operators in Germany, with around 160 facilities across 14 federal states.

== History ==
Asklepios Kliniken – named after the Greek god of medicine Asclepius – were founded in 1985 by the auditor and lawyer Bernard Broermann and the surgeon Lutz Helmig. Through a spin-off of Helmig's shares, the Helios Kliniken GmbH was created from the Asklepios Group in 1994.

Since its founding, the Asklepios Kliniken group has continuously acquired mostly financially troubled municipal hospitals. In 2004, it acquired a 49.9% stake in the Hamburg State Hospital Corporation (LBK), a public law institution at the time. By acquiring an additional 25% in 2007, the LBK was 74.9% privatized and renamed Asklepios Kliniken Hamburg GmbH. The city of Hamburg retained a 25.1% stake.

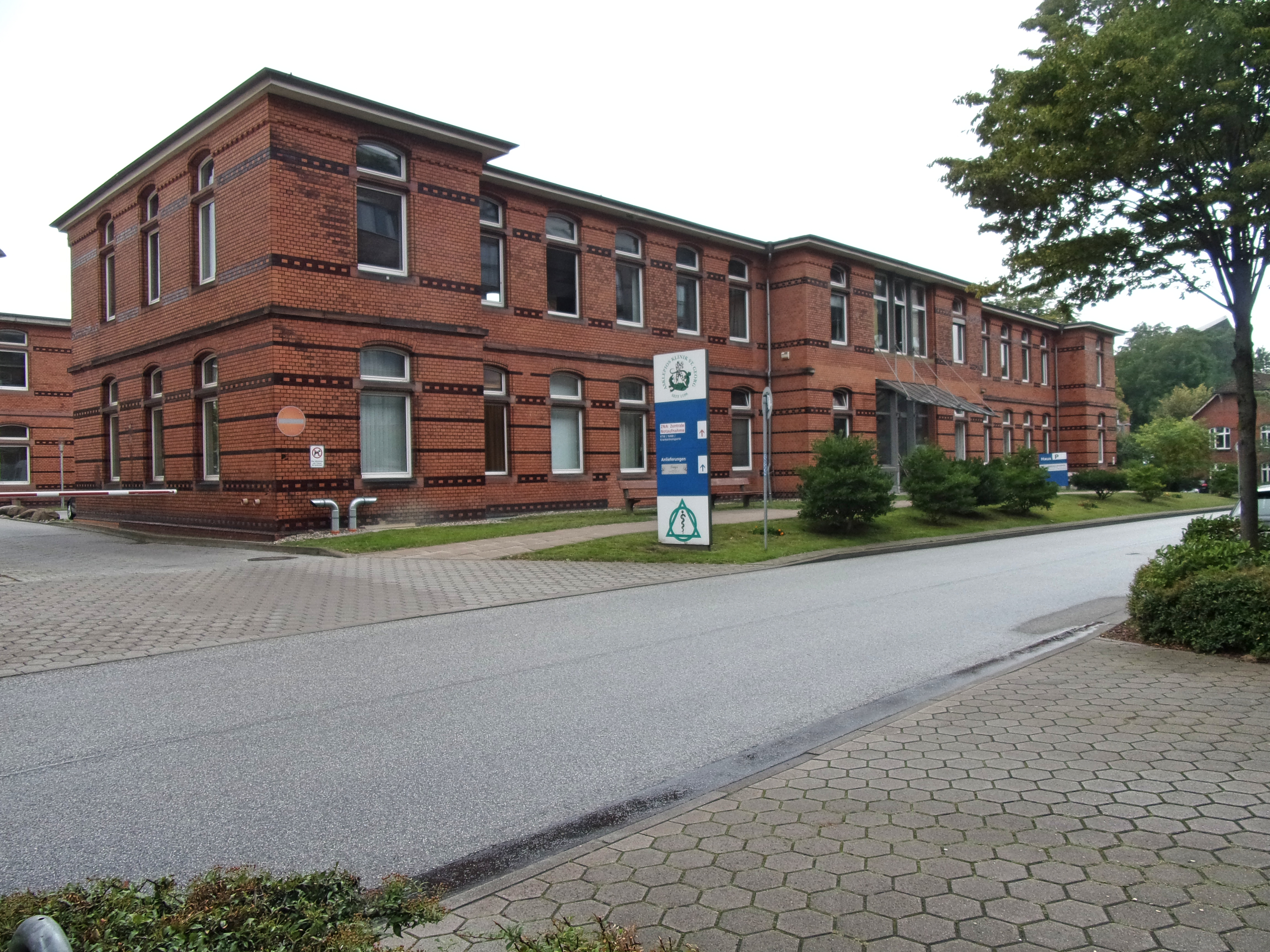
Haus P in the campus of St. Georg Hospital, Hamburg is the main location of the Asklepios Medical School.

Since 2008, Asklepios Kliniken, through the Asklepios Medical School, have operated the Asklepios Campus Hamburg as a clinical training site for medical education in cooperation with the Hungarian Semmelweis University.

In 2011, Asklepios Kliniken acquired a majority stake in Mediclin AG, based in Offenburg, increasing its share to 52.7%. Previously, Asklepios Kliniken had already held around 34.7% of the shares. A year later, Asklepios Kliniken acquired shares in Rhön-Klinikum AG for the first time. In 2013, Asklepios Kliniken increased its stake to around 10%, giving the group a veto right to prevent the takeover of Rhön by other competitors. In the following years, Asklepios Kliniken increasingly acquired shares in Rhön, obtaining a significant portion in 2020, resulting in Asklepios Kliniken holding a total of 92.58% of Rhön's shares that year.

In Bad Oldesloe, Asklepios Kliniken opened a logistics center for healthcare supply in 2022, investing over €40 million. This center supplies the group's own medical facilities as well as hospitals operated by other organizations. The facility was built to prevent potential supply chain disruptions, as experienced during the COVID-19 pandemic.

Since 2025, Asklepios has been using drones to transport medical laboratory samples between its sites in Selent and Bad Oldesloe in Schleswig-Holstein. The route stretches around 50 to 60 kilometres. Samples from Selent are transported to Bad Oldesloe for analysis, as the smaller site does not have its own suitably equipped laboratory. According to the NDR, the service, which launched in March 2025, was the first regular drone route of its kind in Germany.

Asklepios and the Medical School Hamburg announced in 2026 that they would be expanding medical training in Hamburg. From October 2026, the two institutions will work together to create around 75 additional places per semester for the degree programme in medicine.

== Corporate structure ==
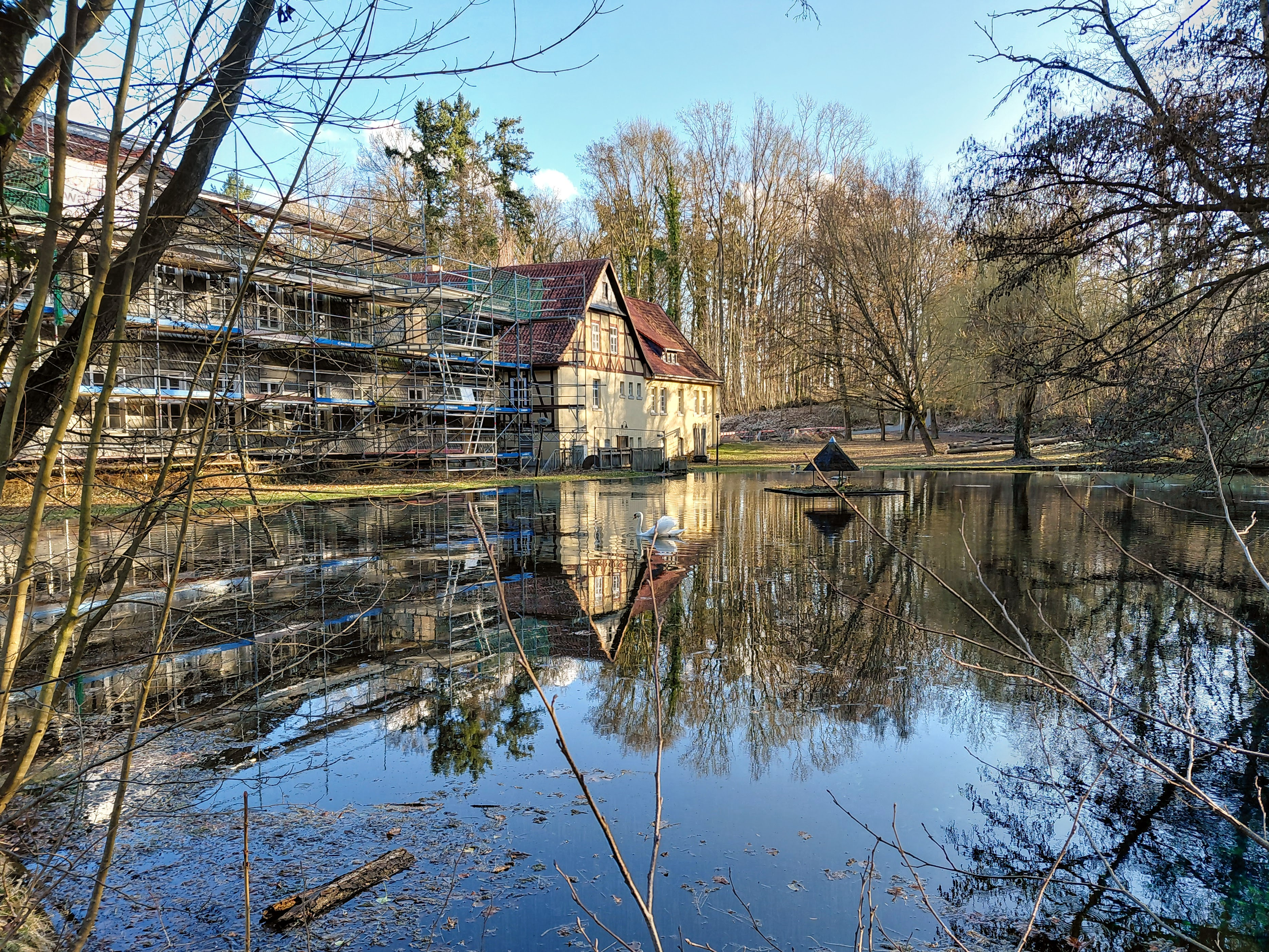
Tiefenbrunn Specialised Clinic in Rosdorf, one of the group’s psychiatric facilities

In the fiscal year 2024, the group generated revenue of €5.96 billion and employed 50,904 staff members. The leading company of the group is Asklepios Kliniken GmbH & Co. KGaA. The parent company of Asklepios Kliniken GmbH & Co. KGaA is Broermann Holding GmbH, controlled by the heirs of the company's founder, Bernard große Broermann.

The group includes fully consolidated subsidiaries such as Asklepios Kliniken Hamburg GmbH, Mediclin AG, and Rhön-Klinikum AG.

The group primarily operates in the German market, with 160 associated facilities across 14 federal states. In addition to hospitals, including six maximum care providers, the group runs specialist clinics, psychiatric hospitals, and post-acute and rehabilitation clinics.

== Criticism ==
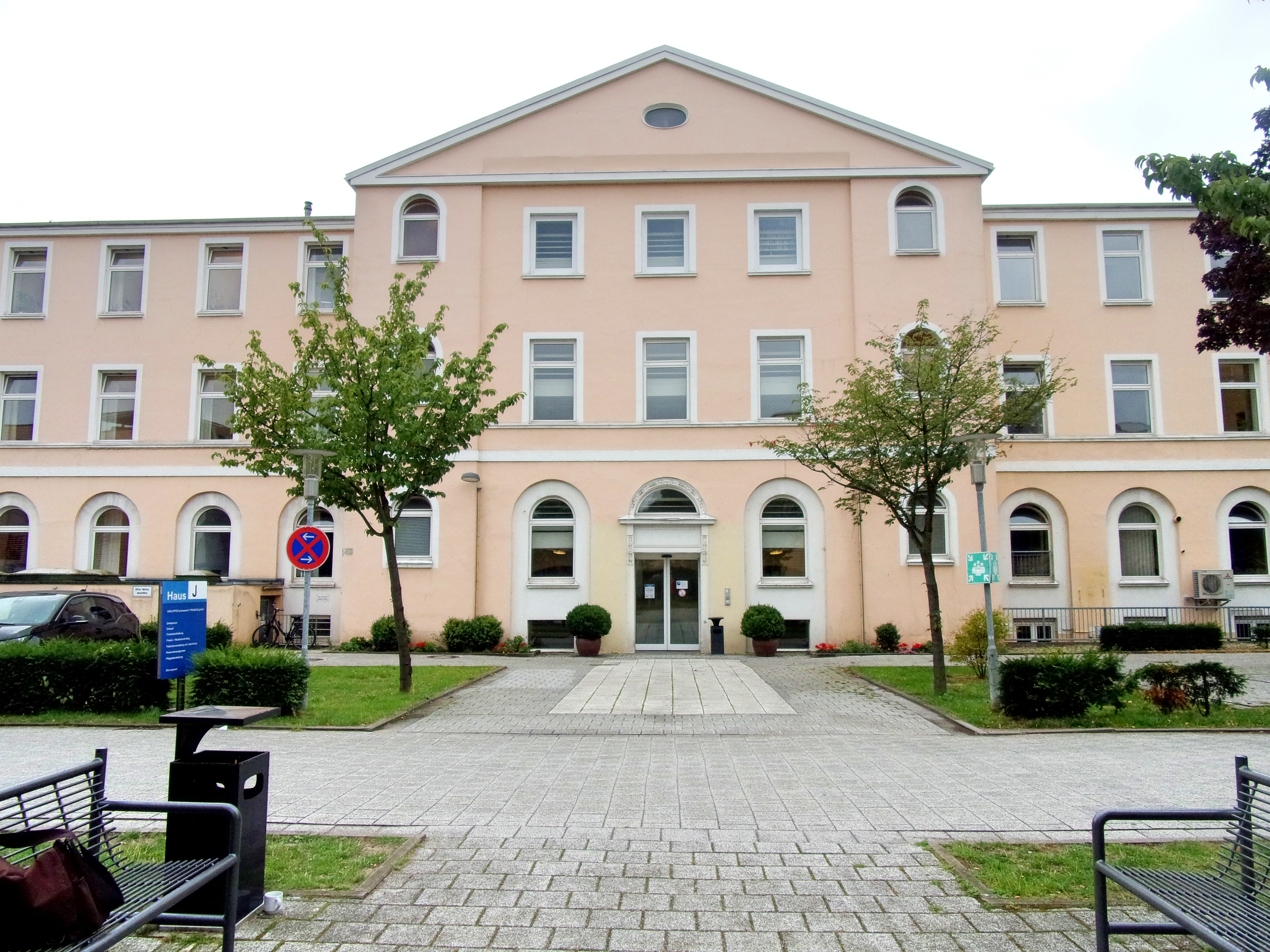
St. Georg Hospital, Hamburg

In 2016, Der Spiegel dedicated an extensive investigative cover story to Asklepios Kliniken. This criticism also highlighted broader issues such as the privatization of hospitals and the shortage of skilled healthcare workers. The then-chairman of the Asklepios employee representative committee stated in 2017 that the staffing shortage in Hamburg's Asklepios clinics was less severe than in other clinics.

In late 2020, a nurse and works council member criticized in an interview with Norddeutscher Rundfunk that the staff in the intensive care unit at the St. Georg Hospital in Hamburg were overburdened, having to clean instead of focusing on patient care, and that patients were dying alone in the wards. Asklepios initially sought to dismiss the nurse, but the works council refused to approve the dismissal. Following public support for the nurse, the company withdrew the dismissal.
