= Richard DiMarchi =

American chemist (born 1952

Richard D. DiMarchi (born December 5, 1952) is an American pharmaceutical chemist, academic, and businessman. He is the current chairman in biomolecular sciences and professor of chemistry at Indiana University. He is most notable for his work as a former vice president at Eli Lilly and Company.

He received his bachelor's degree from Florida Atlantic University in 1974, and his doctorate from Indiana University in 1979. He did his postdoctoral research at Rockefeller University under the mentorship of Nobel laureate Robert Bruce Merrifield.

DiMarchi recently developed a synthetic analog of the human version of the hormone glucagon. DiMarchi's glucagon analog possesses similar biological properties to natural glucagon. It dissolves easily and maintains its structural integrity over extended periods at room temperature.

DiMarchi left Eli Lilly in 2003 after working for 22 years, and has since founded six biotech companies based on the research he began there. He co-founded Ambrx along with Peter G. Schultz, that modifies therapeutic proteins to treat metabolic-related diseases, and later acquired by a Chinese consortium in 2015. In 2006, his lab at Indiana University spun off Marcadia Biotech, focusing on obesity and diabetes. It was sold to Roche in 2010, where DiMarchi worked on a part-time basis for three years. He co-founded Calibrium and MB2 in 2013 and 2015, respectively, both of which were eventually acquired by Novo.

He is the Linda & Jack Gill Chair in Biomolecular Sciences and Professor of Chemistry at Indiana University. He was inducted into the National Inventors Hall of Fame in 2014 for his role in the scientific advancements that led to the development of some of the first rDNA-derived medicines, including Humalog and Forteo. The following year, he was elected as member of the National Academy of Medicine. In 2016, he received the Alfred Burger Award in Medicinal Chemistry from American Chemical Society.
