= HM Hospitales =

Healthcare organization in Madrid, Spain

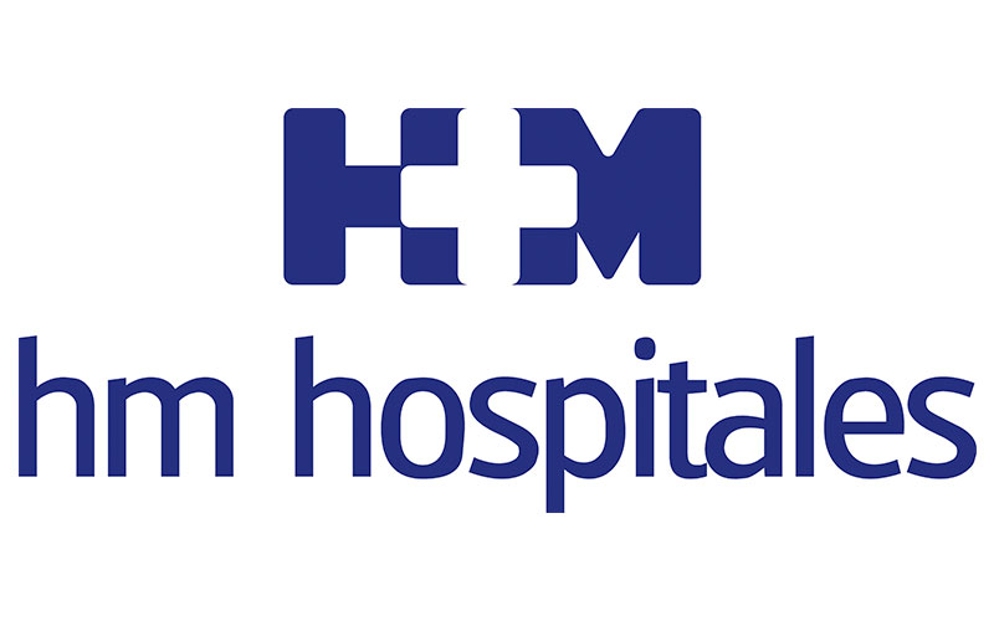
- Company type: Private
- Industry: Healthcare
- Founded: Madrid, 1989
- Founder: Juan Abarca Campal Carmen Cidón Tamargo
- Headquarters: Madrid, Spain
- Area served: Madrid, Galicia, Cataluña, Andalucía, Castilla y León y Castilla-La Mancha
- Key people: Juan Abarca Cidón (CEO)
- Products: Hospitals and scientific research centers
- Revenue: 574 million € (2021)
- Number of employees: 6,500
- Website: https://www.hmhospitales.com/

HM Hospitales is a private Spanish hospital group with a presence in the autonomous communities of Madrid, Galicia, Catalonia, Andalusia, Castilla-León and Castilla-La Mancha. It has 48 healthcare centers. Since 2008, the hospitals in the Community of Madrid have been university hospitals carrying out research and teaching.

== Hospitals and centers ==
The Group has 21 hospitals and 8 hospitals for mothers and children: 8 in the Community of Madrid, 4 in the Community of Galicia, 2 in León, 3 in Catalonia and 4 in Andalusia. It also has three monographic centers in Oncology, Cardiology and Neurosciences, and three centers specializing in Assisted Reproduction, Dentistry and Ophthalmology. In addition, there are 21 polyclinics distributed throughout the Community of Madrid, the Galician Community, Castilla-La Mancha and Catalonia.

== Expansion and acquisitions ==
The group's beginnings date back to 1989 when the founders, Dr. Juan Abarca Campal and his wife, Dr. Carmen Cidón Tamargo, obtained the lease of the former Hospital de San Pedro Apóstol in Madrid, which would later become Hospital Universitario HM Madrid, located in the center of the city. This marked the beginning of the HM Hospitales Group, whose initial name was Grupo Hospitales de Madrid, and whose initials HM accompany all its centers.

Since 1997, several hospitals in the Community of Madrid have been built or joined the group, such as the Hospital Universitario HM Montepríncipe (Boadilla del Monte), and the Hospital Universitario HM Torrelodones in 2004. In 2007 the Hospital Universitario HM Sanchinarro was inaugurated, which includes the Centro Integral Oncológico Clara Campal (HM CIOCC).

In 2007 the Hospital de Madrid Montepríncipe achieved accreditation as a University Hospital. This accreditation allows undergraduate teaching in all the Health Sciences degrees offered by the CEU San Pablo University. It was thus the first private hospital in the Community of Madrid to achieve university status. University hospital certification was extended in 2008 to most of the hospitals in the HM Group. University teaching was extended to undergraduate and postgraduate levels and research was incorporated. Since then, HM Hospitales university hospitals have been training healthcare professionals, doctors, nurses and dentists.

In 2011, the Belén Maternity Hospital was acquired and renamed Hospital Universitario HM Nuevo Belén. In 2012, the HM CIEC Integral Center for Cardiovascular Diseases, located in the Hospital Universitario HM Montepríncipe, was also launched. In 2015, Hospital Universitario HM Puerta del Sur and the Comprehensive Neurosciences Center (HM CINAC) were inaugurated in Móstoles; in 2016, HM Vallés in Alcalá de Henares.

Expansion into Galicia began in 2014, when the Galician hospitals of the Modelo group, Hospital Modelo de La Coruña and Maternidad Belén, were integrated into the group and renamed Hospital HM Modelo and Maternidad HM Belén. In 2016 La Rosaleda group was acquired, comprising La Rosaleda and La Esperanza hospitals in Santiago de Compostela and the Lalín Medical Center, which were renamed Hospital HM Rosaleda, HM La Esperanza and Policlínico HM Rosaleda Lalín respectively. Also in that year, Policlínico HM IMI in Toledo was incorporated as a "Specialty Center". In 2016 the group purchased 50% of Clínica San Francisco in León, becoming known as Hospital HM San Francisco. In 2017 they reached an agreement with the Diocese of León to incorporate Obra Hospitalaria Nuestra Señora de Regla into its network of centers, which became known as Hospital HM Regla.

HM Hospitales' entry into Catalonia began in 2018 with the shareholding of Centro Médico Delfos, the acquisition of Clínica Sant Jordi in northeast Barcelona, and the purchase of Hospital de Nens specializing in pediatric care, teaching and research. These three centers became known as Hospital HM Nou Delfos, Hospital HM Sant Jordi and Hospital HM Nens. The acquisition agreement also incorporated the social work of the Nens Foundation with the creation of the Fundación HM Obra Social Nens, under the umbrella of Fundación de Investigación HM Hospitales.

Expansion into the Andalusian region from 2022 onwards took place with the incorporation of four hospitals in the province of Málaga: Hospital CHIP, later Hospital HM Malaga, Hospital Dr. Gálvez (Hospital HM Gálvez), and Clínica del Pilar, which became Hospital de Día HM El Pilar. The management of Hospital Santa Elena in Torremolinos was also incorporated into the group, which was renamed Hospital Internacional HM Santa Elena.

== Undergraduate and graduate education ==
Professional training in different healthcare branches is provided by the HM Hospitales Training Center for Biosanitary Professions (FHMPB), with facilities in Boadilla del Monte and Móstoles.

Undergraduate and postgraduate training is provided by the HM Hospitales Faculty of Health Sciences of the Camilo José Cela University (UCJC), created in 2022. Teaching is provided for 10 undergraduate degrees, 5 double degrees, 16 official postgraduate master's degrees and another 8 postgraduate master's degrees of its own, in addition to the master's degree in Intensive Orthodontics offered by the Universitat Abat Oliba.

The specialization of resident doctors and nurses, known as MIR and EIR respectively, is carried out in HM Hospitales following the official protocol of the Ministry of Health, also allowing training stays with internal and external rotations in HM Hospitales.

The Fundación de Investigación HM Hospitales has a scholarship program for the completion of doctoral studies at HM Hospitales.

== Research ==
The research programs are developed by the Fundación de Investigación HM Hospitales, created in 2003, in collaboration with several research institutions, such as the National Cancer Research Center (CNIO), the Spanish National Research Council (CSIC), the Integral Neuroscience Center HM CINAC, the Clara Campal Integral Oncology Center HM CIOCC, the Integral Center for Cardiovascular Diseases HM CIEC, the Institute of Applied Molecular Medicine (IMMA), and the Polytechnic University of Madrid (UPM).

The different research projects are included in programs in Oncology, Cardiology, Neurosciences, General Surgery, Maxillofacial Surgery, Traumatology and Anesthesiology, and are carried out in the group's hospitals, polyclinics and comprehensive centers.

The Fundación de Investigación HM Hospitales and the HM Hospitales Group have signed agreements with different companies that control research chairs: Klockner C. of Implantology; Sanyres C. in Personalized Geriatrics; C. Siemens Healthineers in Pet-Rm; C. Artificial Intelligence in Health; C. in Applied Neurokinematics; Novo Nordisk C. in Pharmacoeconomics of Obesity and Cardiovascular Risk; C. in Evolutionary Otoacoustics Research and Paleoanthropology; C. in Sports Traumatology; and chair in Efficiency-based Medicine.

Since 2021, the Fundación de Investigación HM Hospitales has been organizing the Doctor Juan Abarca International Award for Medical Sciences, known as Abarca Prize, which recognizes research work and the impact of medical-scientific advances and innovations through a biomedical finding of worldwide relevance.

== Corporate organization ==
HM Hospitales is managed by physicians and its shareholders are 100% Spanish. It has more than 6,500 medical and healthcare professionals. The president is Dr Juan Abarca Cidón, the CEO is Alejandro Abarca Cidón and the vice-president is Dr. Elena Abarca Cidón. The last known turnover figure corresponds to 2021 and amounts to 574 million euros.
