= Juan Abarca Cidón =

Spanish doctor, lawyer, and businessman

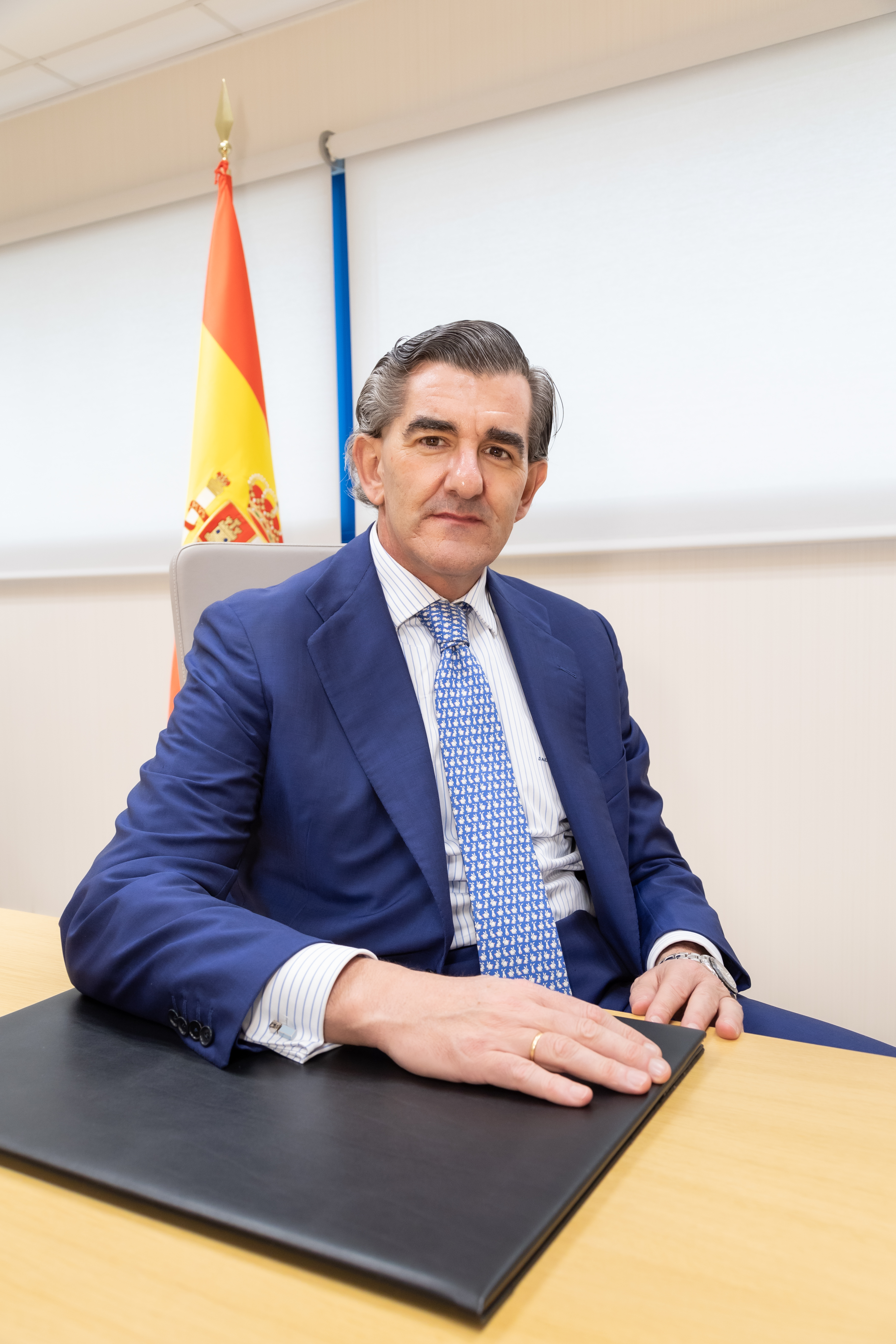
- Born: 1971 (age 54–55); Madrid
- Education: Doctor of Medicine
- Alma mater: Complutense University of Madrid
- Occupation: President HM Hospitales

Juan Abarca Cidón (Madrid, 1971) is a Spanish doctor, lawyer and entrepreneur. He is the chairman of both the HM Hospitals Group and the Promede Group. He is also the author of several essays and a regular contributor to various media outlets.

== Education and training ==
He comes from a family in the medical business. He is the son of Juan Abarca Campal, a surgeon, and Carmen Cidón Tamargo, a medical analyst, both founders of the HM Hospitales Group.

Abarca Cidón is a Doctor of Medicine and holds a degree in Law. He studied medicine at the Complutense University of Madrid. In 2017 he obtained his Doctorate in Medicine from the University of San Pablo CEU. Between 2002 and 2016 he was General Manager of the HM Hospitales Group. In 2013, he temporarily resigned as CEO because of differences with his brothers regarding the management model. Since 2016 he has been Chairman of the Group.

In 2002, he founded the company Profesionales de la Medicina y el Derecho S.A. (PROMEDE), which carries out health and personal injury assessments for the judiciary. He is the company's president and CEO. The Promede Group comprises Promede, a medical and healthcare assessment company; Perivet, a veterinary assessment company; and the Networks Platform, which facilitates the out-of-court settlement of healthcare disputes.

In 2010, he co-founded the Institute for the Development and Integration of Healthcare (IDIS Foundation), and served as its president from 2019 to 2025. Among other positions, he is Vice President of the Spanish Association of Health Law (Asociación Española de Derecho Sanitario), a member of the Board of Directors of the newspaper El Español, and has been a member of the Advisory Council of the Ministry of Health (2012–19). He is ranked among the top 100 business leaders in Spain for reputation.

He was a candidate for the doctors' governing body and has a number of supporters on its board.

== Scientific Publications in Spanish ==
- Abarca Cidón, J. Análisis de la Ley General de Sanidad en la realidad del siglo XXI. Propuestas para un modelo sanitario sostenible, 2017
- Abarca Cidón, J. El sistema sanitario español. De sus orígenes hasta nuestros días. Esfera de los libros, 2019
- Abarca Cidón, J. “Big data”, el arma que nos ayuda a doblegar al COVID-19, I+S: Revista de la Sociedad Española de Informática y Salud, nº 142, 20
- Abarca Cidón, J. y Pérez Iñigo, F. Un modelo de hospital. Ars Médica, 2001 (4 ediciones).
- Abarca Cidón, J. y Juan-Peláez, F. Actuación profesional en el ámbito hospitalario, Aula Salud Siglo XXI, 2003.

== Recognition ==
- Reflexiones Award IX Edition, 2014.
- Medal of Honour, Fundación Bamberg, 2017.
- Spanish Association of Human Resources Directors Award, 2021.
- 26th EY Entrepreneur of the Year Award (2022).
- Madrileño of the Year Award, 2023.
