= Philippe Sansonetti =

French microbiologist (born 1949)

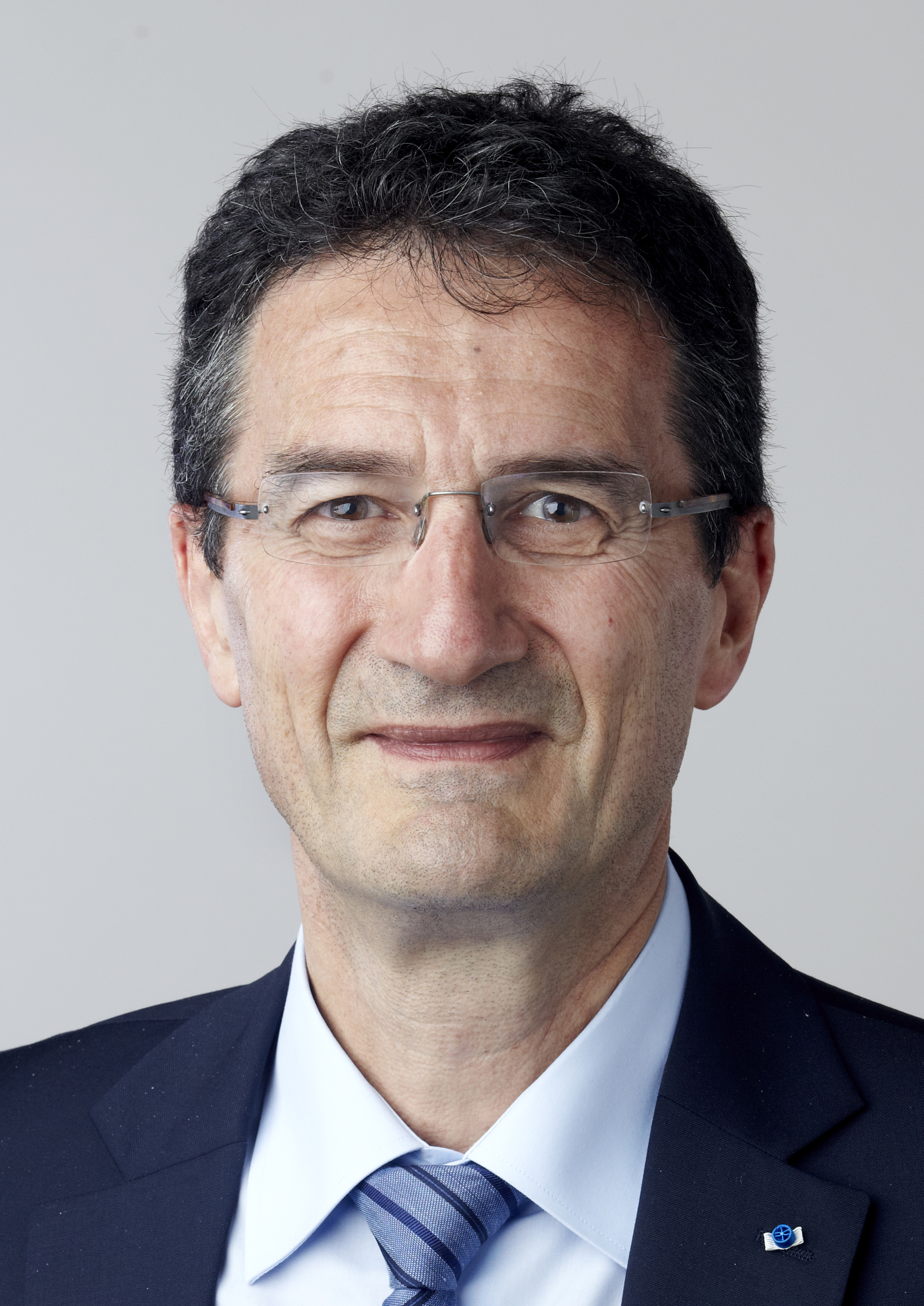
- Philippe Sansonetti, in 2014
- Born: Philippe Joseph Sansonetti; 9 April 1949 (age 77); Paris, France
- Education: Paris Diderot University; University of Paris 6
- Awards: ForMemRS (2014); Louis-Jeantet Prize for Medicine (1994)
- Website: www.hhmi.org/scientists/philippe-j-sansonetti

Philippe J. Sansonetti (born 9 April 1949) is a French microbiologist, professor at the Pasteur Institute and the Collège de France in Paris. He is the director of the Inserm Unit 786 (Microbial colonisation and invasion of mucosa) and of the Institut Pasteur laboratory Pathogénie Microbienne Moléculaire.

== Education ==
Philippe Sansonetti completed General Microbiology, General Virology and Immunology courses at the Institut Pasteur and received his MS degree in Biochemistry/Microbiology from the University Paris VII Diderot in 1978 and obtained his MD degree from the University Paris VI in 1979. After a research fellowship at the Unité de Bactériologie Médicale headed by Léon Le Minor, he undertook a post-doctoral position in the laboratory of Professor Samuel Formal in the Department of Enteric Diseases at the Walter Reed Army Institute of Research, Washington, D.C. He returned to the Pasteur Institute in 1981 to the Enterobacteria Unit (Unité des entérobactéries) where he started his own research group. In 1989, he created and headed the Unité de Pathogénie Microbienne Moléculaire (Molecular Microbial Pathogenesis Unit). He practiced internal medicine at the Institut Pasteur hospital (1981–1985) before becoming head of its outpatient clinic (1985–1995) and then becoming its medical director (1995–1999 and 2004–2007). He was chairman of its Departments of Bacteriology and Mycology (1989–1992) and Cell Biology and Infection (2002–2006).

Sansonetti has held several scientific administration positions at INSERM, French Ministry of Research and Technology, as well as at the World Health Organization where he was chairman of the Steering committee on Diarrheal Diseases Vaccine Development.

== Work and honours ==
Research performed by Philippe Sansonetti has mainly been focused on the understanding of several aspects of the pathogenesis of Shigella, a bacterium causing severe diarrhoea. His work spans a large set of disciplines in biology and medicine and ranges from molecular genetics, to cell biology, immunology and the development of vaccines against dysentery. Sansonetti's laboratory has notably shown that Shigella pathogenesis is imparted by a large virulence plasmid containing a pathogenicity island encoding a type three secretion system required for entry into epithelial cells; characterised the molecular mechanisms leading to Shigella epithelial cell invasion and intracellular motility; demonstrated that Shigella kills macrophages by pyroptosis; identified that intracellular bacteria are detected by Nod proteins leading to production of pro-inflammatory cytokines and identified a pool of Shigella effectors controlling both innate and adaptive responses. He also actively contributes to the development of vaccine candidates against the major shigellae causing dysentery in the developing world.

Sansonetti is the author of over 500 publications in peer-reviewed journals and has served as an editor of several professional publications for many years. He is considered to be one of the founders of the cellular microbiology field and has launched an eponym scientific publication dedicated to this field. His achievements in science have been recognised by numerous awards, including:

- Jacques Monod prize for excellence in molecular biology
- Louis-Jeantet Prize for Medicine (1994)
- Robert Koch Prize
- Andre Lwoff Medal by the Federation of European Microbiological Societies
- Foreign Member of the Royal Society of London (ForMemRS) (2014)
- Abarca Prize 2022 for his research on Shigellosis or bacillary dysentery.

He was appointed a Knight of the National Order of the Legion of Honour Légion d'honneur and Officer of the Ordre National du Mérite. He has also been elected Member of European Molecular Biology Organisation, the French Academy of Sciences, the German Academy of Sciences Leopoldina, the American Association for the Advancement of Science the US National Academy of Sciences, and corresponding member of the French Academy of Medicine. He is also a Howard Hughes Medical Institute scholar. Since 2008, he has held the position of Professor at the Collège de France, recipient of the Microbiology and Infectious Diseases Chair. His nomination for the Royal Society reads:

Sansonetti has pioneered the study of molecular pathogenesis of bacterial infections and cellular microbiology, based on his discovery of the mechanism of cell invasion by Shigella. He has led the field practically and conceptually, by discovering key processes relevant to many pathogens and demonstrating the way in which bacteria subvert eukaryotic cells for their growth. These include actin-dependent entry, cell-to-cell spread, pro-inflammatory apoptosis, intracellular sensing of bacteria, regulation of host responses by post-translational modifications, repression of innate immunity genes, and blocking of T-cell migration. Collectively his work has provided the most complete and unified view of a bacterial-controlled disease process.
