= Marginal-zone B cell =

Type of immune cell

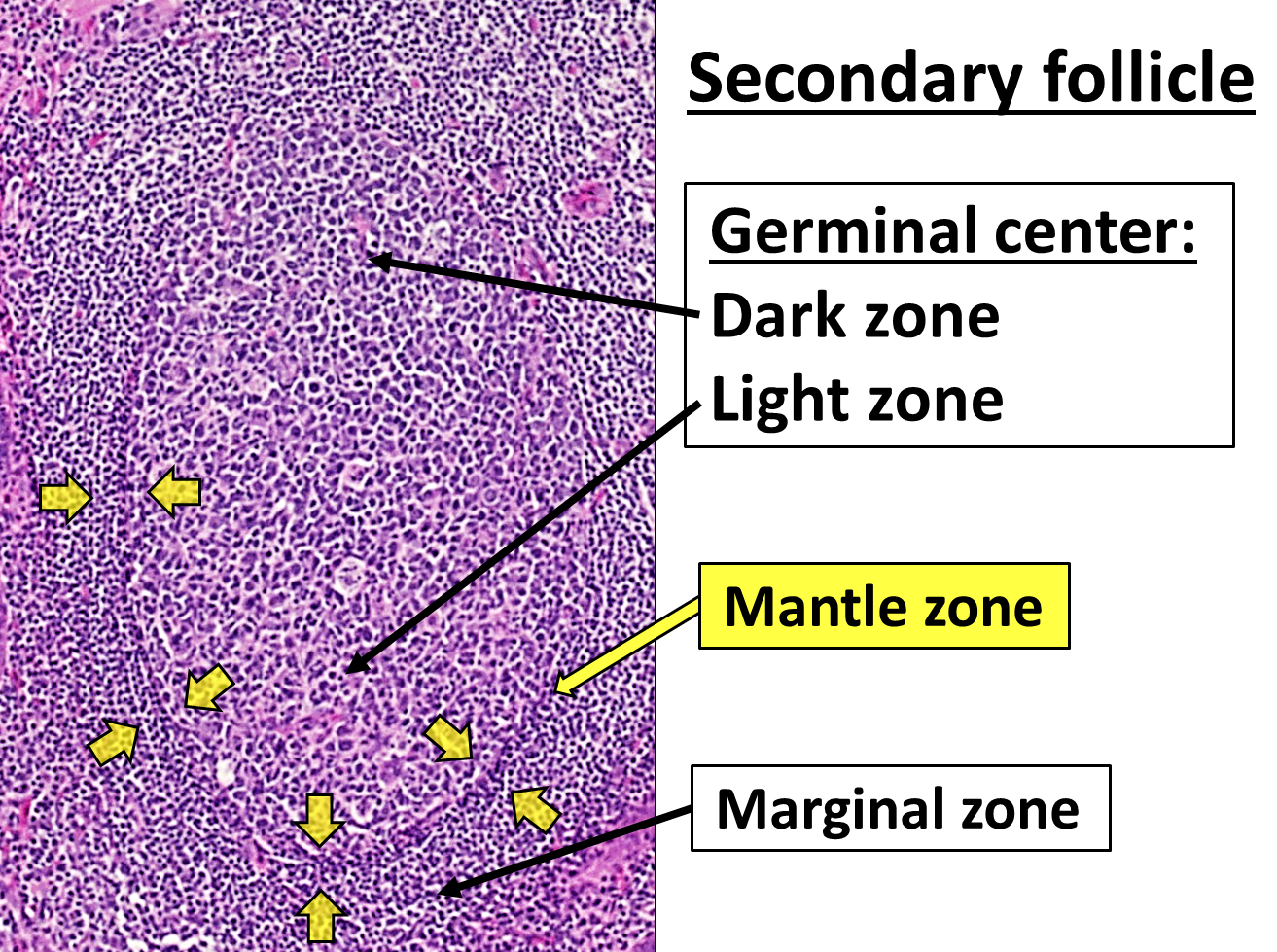
Histology of a normal lymphoid follicle, with marginal zone annotated at bottom.

Marginal-zone B cells (MZ B cells) are noncirculating mature B cells that in humans segregate anatomically into the marginal zone (MZ) of the spleen and certain other types of lymphoid tissue. The MZ B cells within this region typically express low-affinity polyreactive B-cell receptors (BCR), high levels of IgM, Toll-like receptors (TLRs), CD21, CD1, CD9, CD27 with low to negligible levels of secreted-IgD, CD23, CD5, and CD11b that help to distinguish them phenotypically from follicular (FO) B cells and B1 B cells.

MZ B cells are innate-like B cells specialized to mount rapid T-independent, but also T-dependent responses against blood-borne pathogens. They are also known to be the main producers of IgM antibodies in humans.

== Development and differentiation ==
The spleen's marginal zone contains multiple subtypes of macrophages and dendritic cells interlaced with the MZ B cells; it is not fully formed until 2 to 3 weeks after birth in rodents and 1 to 2 years in humans. In humans, but not rodents, marginal zone B cells are also located in the inner wall of the subcapsular sinus of lymph nodes, the epithelium of tonsillar crypts, and the sub-epithelial area of mucosa-associated lymphoid tissues including the sub-epithelial dome of intestinal Peyer's patches. Human MZ B cells are also present in peripheral blood, suggesting that they recirculate. However, in mice they seem to be noncirculating and only limited to follicular shuttling.

In rodents, MZ B cells are recognized as IgM^{high}IgD^{low}CD21^{high}CD23^{low} population of B cells. They are furthermore distinguished by the expression of CD9 and CD27 (in humans). In mice, MZ B cells characteristically express high levels of CD1d, which is an MHC class I-like molecule involved in the presentation of lipid molecules to NKT cells. Unlike FO B cells, MZ B cells express polyreactive BCRs that bind to multiple microbial molecular patterns. Additionally, they express high levels of TLRs.

In specimens where the tyrosine kinase for Pyk-2 has been knocked-out, marginal zone B-cells will fail to develop while B-1 cells will still be present. MZ B-cells are the only B-cells dependent on NOTCH2 signaling for proliferation.

== Activation and function ==
Similar to B1 B cells, MZ B cells can be rapidly recruited into the early adaptive immune responses in a T cell-independent manner. The MZ B cells are especially well-positioned as the first line of defense against systemic blood-borne antigens that enter the circulation and become trapped in the spleen. While large blood-borne antigens are captured by dendritic cells, circulating granulocytes or MZ macrophages, smaller blood-borne antigens may directly interact with MZ B cells situated on the exterior of the marginal sinus. MZ B cells shuttle between the blood-filled marginal zone for antigen collection and the follicle for antigen delivery to follicular dendritic cells. In mice, it has been shown that these cells shear flow via the LFA-1 integrin ligand ICAM-1 and adhere or migrate down the flow via the VLA-4 integrin ligand VCAM-1. While CXCR5/CXCL13 signaling is required for MZ B cells to enter the follicle, Sphingosine-1-phosphate signaling is required for them to exit from the follicle.

MZ B cells respond to a wide spectrum of T-independent, but also T-dependent antigens. It is believed that MZ B cells are especially reactive to microbial polysaccharide antigens of encapsulated bacteria such as Streptococcus pneumoniae, Haemophilus influenzae and Neisseria meningitidis. TLRs often activate MZ B cells after recognizing microbial molecular structures in cooperation with the BCR. These innate-like B cells provide a rapid first line of defense against blood-borne pathogens and produce low-affinity antibodies of wide specificity before the induction of T-cell-dependent high-affinity antibody responses. Therefore, MZ B cells may play an important role in the prevention of sepsis. MZ B cells also display a lower activation threshold than their FO B cell counterparts, with a heightened propensity for plasma cell differentiation that contributes further to the accelerated primary antibody response. They have been acknowledged as the main producers of IgM antibodies in humans.

They are important for antibody-response toward invading pathogens and maintaining homeostasis via opsonization of dead cells and cellular debris. Moreover, MZ B cells are potent antigen-presenting cells, that are able to activate CD4+ T cells more effectively than FO B cells due to their elevated expression levels of MHC class II, CD80 and CD86 molecules.

Deficiencies of MZ B cells are associated with a higher risk of pneumococcal infection, meningitis and insufficient antibody response to capsular polysaccharides.

== Memory ==
In humans the splenic marginal zone B cells have evidence of somatic hypermutation in their immunoglobulin genes, indicating that they have been generated through a germinal centre reaction to become memory cells. While naive MZ B cells produce low-affinity IgM antibodies, memory MZ B cells express high-affinity Ig molecules. Besides unswitched cells (IgM+), class-switched B cells can be found in the human and rodent marginal zone (IgG+ and IgA+). In humans, MZ B cells express CD27, which is a member of the TNF-receptor family expressed by human memory B cells.

== Role in autoimmune diseases ==
Many of MZ B cell-receptors are self-reactive, which may be a factor that contributes to their expansion in some autoimmune diseases. On the other hand, aiding in the clearance of self-antigens is considered an important mechanism to prevent the development of autoimmune diseases. The role of expanded self-reactive MZ B cells has been observed on mice models of lupus, diabetes and arthritis. However, their levels in human vasculitis are reduced.

== Role in tumors ==
Marginal zone B cells are the malignant cells in marginal zone lymphomas, a heterogeneous group of generally indolent lymphomas.
