= Lymphopoiesis =

Process which produces lymphocytes

Lymphopoiesis (lĭm'fō-poi-ē'sĭs) (or lymphocytopoiesis) is the generation of lymphocytes, one of the five types of white blood cells (WBCs). It is more formally known as lymphoid hematopoiesis.

Disruption in lymphopoiesis can lead to a number of lymphoproliferative disorders, such as lymphomas and lymphoid leukemias.

== Overview ==
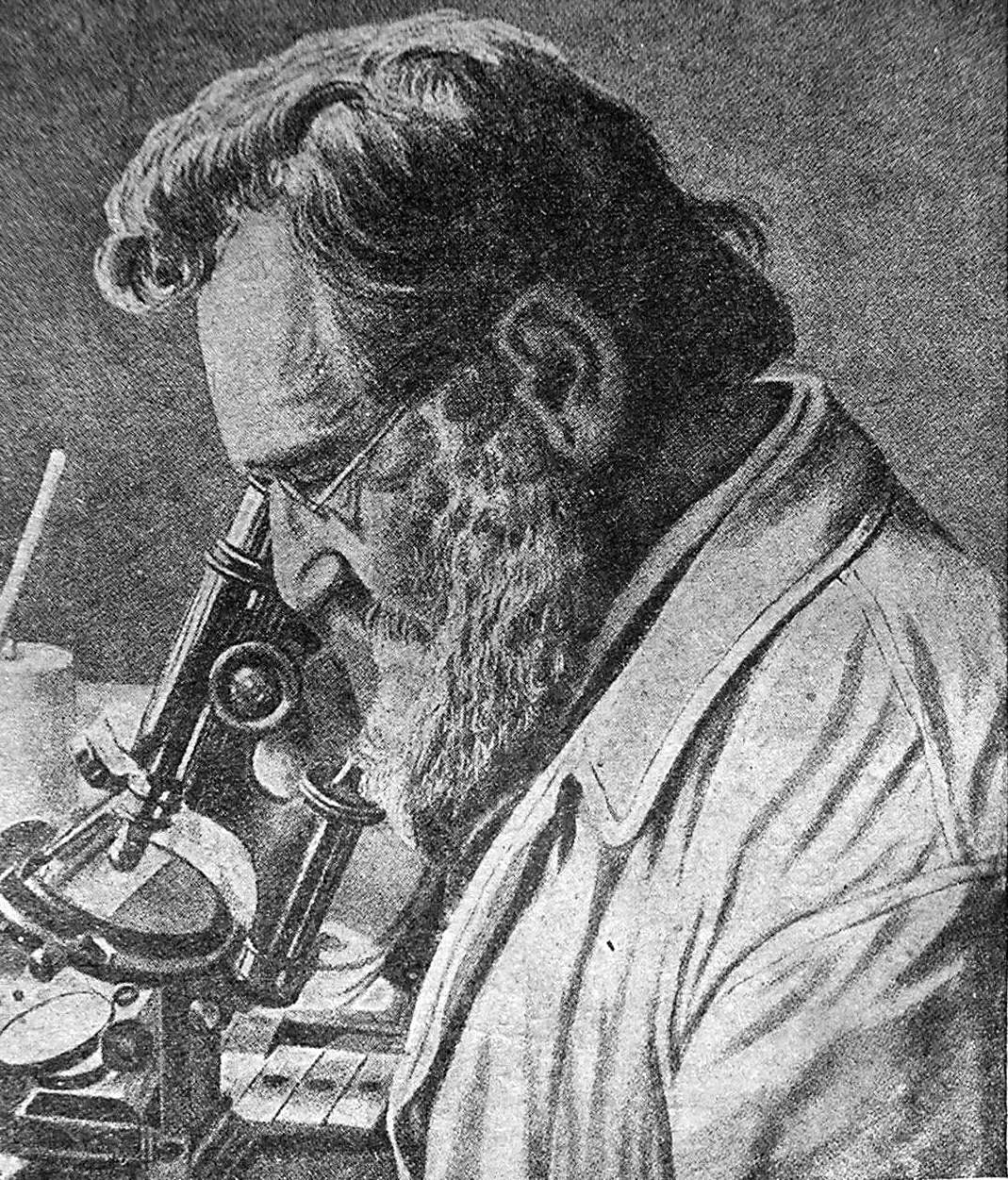
Immunology pioneer Elie Metchnikoff

Lymphocytes are blood cells of lymphoid (rather than the myeloid or erythroid) lineage. Lymphocytes are found in the bloodstream and originate in the bone marrow, however, they principally belong to the separate lymphatic system, which interacts with the blood circulation.

Lymphopoiesis is now usually used interchangeably with the term "lymphocytopoiesis" – the making of lymphocytes, but some sources distinguish between the two, stating that "lymphopoiesis" additionally refers to creating lymphatic tissue, while "lymphocytopoiesis" refers only to the creation of cells in that tissue.

The two classes of WBCs in mice originate from progenitor cells: myeloids from the common myeloid progenitor (CMP), and lymphoids from the common lymphoid progenitor (CLP).

In the case of mammals such as humans (Homo sapiens), lymphopoiesis begins with limited passive provision from the mother. This includes lymphocytes and immunoglobulin G that cross the placenta and enter the fetus to provide some protection against pathogens, as well as leukocytes that come from breast milk and enter circulation via the digestive tract. It is often not effective in preventing infections in the newborn.

However, early in gestation, the developing embryo has begun its own lymphopoiesis from the fetal liver. Lymphopoiesis also arises from the yolk sac. This is in contrast to the adult where all lymphocytes originate in the bone marrow.

There are four major types of lymphocytes, along with many sub-types.

== Function ==
Mature lymphocytes are a critical part of the immune system that, with the exception of memory B and T cells, have short lives measured in days or weeks and must be continuously generated throughout life by cell division and differentiation from cells such as common lymphoid progenitors (CLPs) in mice.

The set comprising CLP cells and similar progenitors are themselves descendants of the pluripotential hemopoietic stem cell (pHSC), which is capable of generating all of the cell types of the complete blood cell system. Despite their ability to generate the complete suite of lymphocytes, most progenitors are not true stem cells, and must be continually renewed by differentiation from the pHSC stem cell.

Many progenitor cells are also referred to as transit cells, sometimes also called transit amplifying cells, the meaning of this term being that the transit cell may find a new sub-lineage but the number of resultant cells is strictly limited (although possibly very large, even trillions yet finite) and the lineage is terminated by cells that die off (by apoptosis) or remain as cells that can no longer divide. Examples of such cells are CFUs (Colony-forming units – referred to as such because of their ability to form colonies in vitro in artificial media) such as CFU-T.

Transplantation of a single pHSC cell can reconstitute a sub-lethally irradiated host (i.e. a mouse that has been irradiated so that all leukocytes are killed) with all these lineages of cells, including all types of lymphocytes via CLPs.

Lymphopoiesis continues throughout life and so progenitor cells and their parent stem cells must always be present.

== Process ==
Lymphopoiesis Acronyms
- B-NK Progenitor for B and NK; CB Cord blood; CFU Colony-forming Unit; CLP Common Lymphoid Progenitor; CMP Common Myeloid Progenitor; DC Dendritic Cell (Myeloid or Lymphoid); ELP Early Lymphoid Progenitors; ETP the most primitive cells in the thymus are the Early Thymocyte Progenitors; G-CSF Granulocyte Colony Stimulating Factor; GM-CSF Granulocyte Macrophage Colony Stimulating Factor; GMP Granulocyte Macrophage Progenitor; HSC pluripotential Hemopoietic Stem Cell; MDC combined Macrophage and DC progenitor potential; MEP megakaryocytic and erythroid progenitor; MLP Multi-lymphoid Progenitor potential, any progenitor minimally able to give rise to B cells, T cells and NK cells; MPP Multipotent Progenitor; Notch Notch signaling pathway re T Cell commitment from progenitors

Lymphopoiesis is a recursive process of cell division and also as a process of differentiation, measured by changes to the properties of cells. The function of lymphopoiesis is the production of various lymphocytes from common lymphoid progenitor (CLP) cells, which are in turn derived from hematopoietic stem cells.

=== Division and differentiation ===
Given that lymphocytes arise from specific types of limited stem cells – which we can call P (for Progenitor) cells – such cells can divide in several ways. These are general principles of limited stem cells.

Considering the P as the ‘mother’ cell, but not a true stem cell, it may divide into two new cells, which are themselves identical, but differ to some degree from the mother. Or the mother cell P may divide unequally into two new daughter cells both of which differ from each other and also from the mother.

Any daughter cell will usually have new specialized abilities and if it is able to divide it will form a new sub-lineage. The difference of a daughter cell from the mother may be great, but it could also be much less, even subtle. What the P mother cell does not do is divide into two new P mother cells or a mother and a daughter; this is a matter of observation as such limited progenitor cells are known to not self-renew.

- There is a sort of exception when daughter cells at some level of the lineage may divide several times to form more seemingly identical cells, but then further differentiation and division will inevitably occur, until a final stage is reached in which no further division can occur, and the cell type lineage is finally mature. An example of maturity is a plasma cell, from the B cell lineage, which produces copious antibody, but cannot divide and eventually dies after a few days or weeks.
- The progenitor CLP of the mouse or the progenitor MLP of the human differentiates into lymphocytes by first becoming a lymphoblast (Medical Immunology, p.10). It then divides several more times to become a prolymphocyte that has specific cell-surface markers unique to either a (1) T cell or (2) B cell. The progenitor can also differentiate into (3) natural killer cells (NK) and (4) dendritic cells (DC).
- T cells, B cells and NK cells (and all other Innate lymphoid cells) are unique to the lymphocyte family, but dendritic cells are not. DC that are of identical appearance but have different markers are spread throughout the body, and come from either lymphoid and myeloid lineages. Still, these cells may have somewhat different tasks and may take up lodging preferentially in different locations. (Revise in light of new research) This is now an open question; also, the different dendritic cell lineages may have different ‘tasks’ or functions and stay in different ‘locations.’

T and B lymphocytes are indistinguishable under the microscope. The inactive B and T cells are so featureless with few cytoplasmic organelles and mostly inactive chromatin that they were believed to have no function; they were recognized to have key immune functions in the 1960s.

However, T and B lymphocytes are very distinct cell lineages and they mature in different places in the body. They perform quite different (although co-operative) functions in the body. T and B cells are biochemically distinct and this is reflected in the differing markers and receptors they possess on their cell surfaces. This seems to be true in all vertebrates, although there are many differences in the details between the species.

- Regardless of whether the CLP (mouse) or MLP or a small closely related set of progenitor cells take credit for generating the profusion of lymphocytes, the same lymphoid progenitors can still generate some cells that are clearly identifiably myeloid.

=== Lymphopoiesis for T cells ===
T cells are formed in bone marrow and then migrate to the cortex of the thymus to undergo maturation in an antigen-free environment for about one week where a mere 2–4% of the T cells succeed. The remaining 96–98% of T cells die by apoptosis and are phagocytosed by macrophages in the thymus. So many thymocytes (T cells) die during the maturation process because there is intensive screening to make sure each thymocyte can recognize self-peptide:self-MHC complex and for self-tolerance. Having experienced apoptosis, the thymocyte dies and is quickly recycled.

Upon maturity, there are several forms of thymocytes including

- T-helper (needed for activation of other cells such as B cells and macrophages),
- T-cytotoxic (which kills virally infected cells),
- T-memory (T cells that remember antigens previously encountered), and
- T-suppressor cells (which moderate the immune response of other leukocytes). Also called T-regulatory cells (T_{reg})

When T cells become activated they undergo a further series of developments. A small, resting T lymphocyte rapidly undergoes blastogenic transformation into a large lymphocyte (13–15 μm). This large lymphocyte (known in this context as a lymphoblast) then divides several times to produce an expanded population of medium (9–12 μm) and small lymphocytes (5–8 μm) with the same antigenic specificity. Final activated and differentiated T lymphocytes are once again morphologically indistinguishable from a small, resting lymphocyte. Thus the following developmental states may be noticed in sequence in blood tests:

1. Prolymphocyte
2. Large lymphocyte
3. Small lymphocyte

Basic Map of T Cell lymphopoiesis

This basic map of T Cell formation in sequence, is simplified and is akin to textbook descriptions, and may not reflect latest research. (Medical Immunology, p. 119)

In the thymus

- MLP
- ETP
- DN1
- (B; Mφ)
- DN2
  - (DC; NK)
- DN3
  - (γδ)
- DN4
- DP
  - (TNK; CD4; CD8; T_{reg})

In the Periphery

- (T_{h}1; T_{h}2)

==== T cell development ====
Unlike other lymphoid lineages, T cell development occurs almost exclusively in the thymus. T-lymphopoiesis does not occur automatically but requires signals generated from the thymus stromal cells. Several stages at which specific regulators and growth factors are required for T cell development to proceed have been defined. Later in T cell development and its maturation, these same regulatory factors again are used to influence T cell specialization.

T cells are unique among the lymphocyte populations in their ability to further specialize as mature cells and become yet more mature. T cells come in many flavors, for example: the conventional TcRαβ T cells; the so-called unconventional TcRγδ T cells; NKT cells; and T regulatory cells (T_{reg}). Details regarding the developmental and life cycle of the unconventional T cells are less well-described measured to the conventional T cells.

Stages of T cell maturation

Stage One: Thymus Migration

Multi-potent lymphoid progenitors (MLP) enter the T cell pathway as they immigrate to the thymus. The most primitive cells in the thymus are the early thymocyte progenitors (ETP), which retain all lymphoid and myeloid potential but exist only transiently, rapidly differentiating into T and NK lineages. (Medical Immunology, p. 118)

Stage Two: Proliferative Expansion and T Lineage Commitment

Final commitment to the T cell lineage occurs within the thymus microenvironment, the microscopic structures of the thymus where T cells are nurtured. The most primitive T cells retain multipotential ability and can differentiate into cells of the myeloid or lymphoid lineages (B cells, DC, T cells, or NK cells).

More differentiated double negative T cells (DN2 cells) have more limited potentiality but are not yet fully restricted to the T cell lineage (they can still develop into DC, T cells, or NK cells). Later on, they are fully committed to the T cell lineage- when thymocytes expressing Notch1 receptors engage thymus stromal cells expressing Notch1 ligands, the thymocytes become finally committed to the T-cell lineage. See Gallery Image "Double Negatives"

With the commitment to the T cell lineage, begins a very complex process known as TCR gene rearrangement. This creates an enormous diversity of T cells bearing antigen receptors. Afterward some T cells leave the thymus to migrate to the skin and mucosae.

Stage Three: β-Selection

Stage Four: T Cell Receptors Selection

Only 2% to 3% of the differentiating thymocytes, those that express TcR capable of interaction with MHC molecules, but tolerant to self-peptides, survive the Stage Four selection process.

Stage Five: Continuing Differentiation in the Periphery

It was previously believed that the human thymus remained active as the site of T cell differentiation only until early adulthood and that later in adult life the thymus atrophies, perhaps even vanishing. Recent reports indicate that the human thymus is active throughout adult life. Thus, several factors may contribute to the supply of T cells in adult life: generation in the thymus, extra-thymic differentiation, and the fact that memory T cells are long-lived and survive for decades.

==== T cell types ====
- Unconventional T cells

The thymus also gives rise to the so-called ‘unconventional T cells’ such at γδ T cells, natural killer T cells (NKT) and regulatory T cells (T_{reg}).

- γδ T cells

γδT cells represent only 1% to 5% of the circulating T cells but are abundant in the mucosal immune system and the skin, where they represent the dominant T cell population. These ‘non-MHC restricted T cells’ are involved in specific primary immune responses, tumor surveillance, immune regulation and wound healing.

Several differences between αβ and γδ T cell development have been described. They emigrate from the thymus in "waves" of clonal populations, which home to discrete tissues. For example, one kind is found in the peripheral blood while another predominates in the intestinal tract.

- Natural Killer T cells

Human NKT cells are a unique population and are thought to play an important role in tumor immunity and immunoregulation.

- T Regulatory cells

T_{reg} cells are considered as naturally occurring regulatory T cells. Tregs comprised about 5% of the circulating CD4^{+} T cells. These cells are thought to possess an important autoimmunity property by regulating 'autoreactive' T cells in the periphery. (Medical Immunology, p. 117-122)

=== Lymphopoiesis for B cells ===
B cells are formed and mature in bone marrow (and spleen).

These B cells then leave the bone marrow and migrate via bloodstream and the lymph to peripheral lymphoid tissues, such as a spleen, lymph nodes, tonsils and mucosal tissues. Once in a secondary lymphoid organ the B cell can be introduced to an antigen that it is able to recognize.

Through this antigen recognition and other cell interactions the B cell becomes activated and then divides and differentiates to become a plasma cell. The plasma cell, a B cell end product, is a very active antibody-secreting cell that helps protect the body by attacking and binding to antigen.

Even after many decades of research, some controversy remains as to where B cells mature and 'complete their education', with the possibility remaining that the site may also partially be peri-intestinal lymphoid tissues.

B lymphopoiesis occurs exclusively in the bone marrow and B lymphocytes are made continuously throughout life there in a 'microenvironment' composed of stromal cells, extracellular matrix, cytokines and growth factors, which are critical for proliferation, differentiation, and survival of early lymphocyte and B-lineage precursors.

The relative proportion of precursor B cells in the bone marrow remains rather constant throughout the life span of an organism. There are stages such as Pre-B-I cells (5% to 10% of the total); Pre-B-II cells (60% to 70%) while the remaining 20% to 25% are immature B cells. Most textbooks say that B Cells mature in the bone marrow but, generally, immature B cells migrate to the spleen for 'higher education' of some sort where they go through transitional stages before final maturation. (Medical Immunology, p. 136)

B lymphocytes are identified by the presence of soluble immunoglobulin G (IgG). This is the most common protective immunoglobulin in the adult body. After antigenic stimulation, B cells differentiate into plasma cells that secrete large quantities of soluble IgG. This is the final stage of B lymphopoiesis, but it is the clincher because the plasma cells must either issue antibody close to a source of infection or disseminate it in the blood to fight an infection at a distance or in an inaccessible part of the body.

Basic map of B cell lymphopoiesis

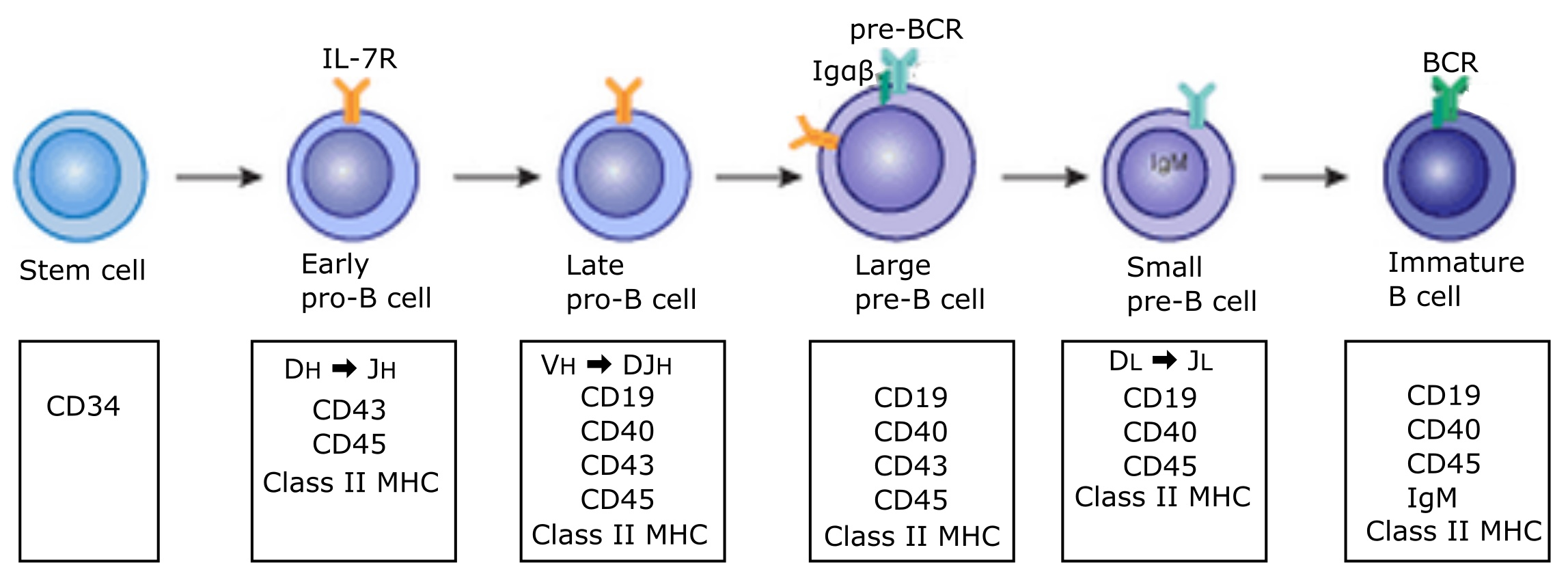
Early B cell development: from stem cell to immature B cell

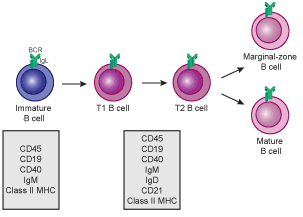
Transitional B cell development: from immature B cell to MZ B cell or mature FO B cell.

A generally regarded valid map of B cell lymphopoiesis is as follows in sequence, in two parts with the first being in the bone marrow and the second in the spleen:. The development process in the bone marrow occurs in germinal centers

In the bone marrow

- Pro-B
- Pre-B-I
- Pre-B-II large
- Pre-B-II small
- Imm(ature)

In the spleen

- T1
- T2/T3
- (Marginal Zone (MZ); B-1; B-2)
- B-2 further differentiate into:
  - (Germinal Center (GC); Memory; Plasma)

=== Lymphopoiesis for NK cells ===
NK cells, which lack antigen specific receptors, develop in the bone marrow. After maturation and release from the marrow they circulate in the blood through their lifetime seeking opportunity. The opportunity they seek is to encounter and recognize and then kill abnormal cells such as cancer or virally infected cells. It is well known that lymphocytes never have granules or at least not granules that are readily visible even upon staining. However, NK cells are the exception. They do have numerous granules which provide their ability to kill cells and these granules are why NK cells have an alternate name- Large Granular Lymphocytes (LGLs).

NK cells are the only lymphocytes considered part of the innate immune system (in contrast to the adaptive immune system. Yet they are much more closely related to T cells (part of the adaptive immune system) than to other cells of the innate immune system. NK cells not only share many surface markers, functions and activities in common with T Cells, they also arise from a common T/NK progenitor. The T/NK precursor is also believed to be the source of a subpopulation of lymphoid DC. (Medical Immunology, p. 121)

NK cells have a definition 'barcode' as CD3, CD16+, CD56t lymphocytes. (See Barcode Section of this article). NK progenitors can be found mainly in the thymus (mouse), but the thymus is not absolutely required for NK development. Probably NK cells can develop in a variety of organs, but the major site of NK cell development is not known.

In humans, the majority (85–90%) of the NK cells have a high cytolytic capacity (the ability to lyse cells). A smaller subset (10–15%) called NK 'CD56 bright' is chiefly responsible for cytokine production and has enhanced survival. Traveling to lymph nodes the 'CD56 bright' NK cells differentiate again into mature NK cells which express killer cell immunoglobulin-like receptors (KIR), natural cytotoxicity receptors (NCR), and critical adhesion molecules. (Medical Immunology, p. 122)

=== Lymphopoiesis for dendritic cells ===
The process by which CLP cells may differentiate to generate dendritic cells of lymphoid lineage is not yet well defined.

DCs are highly specialized and efficient antigen-presenting cells. Cells identical in appearance come both from a myeloid lineage (referred to as myeloid dendritic cells) and also from a lymphoid lineage (referred to as plasmacytoid dendritic cells).

The development and regulation of DC is not well-characterized. While the DC precursors have been identified in the human fetal liver, thymus, and bone marrow, during adult life DC are thought to be produced only from the bone marrow and released into the blood to wander and settle down. Overall, a large number of DC of varying types are dispatched throughout the body, especially at epithelia such as skin, to monitor invaders and nibble their antigens. (Medical Immunology, p. 122)

=== Comparison of killers from lymphopoiesis ===
Lymphocytes have a number of alarming properties such as the ability to wander around the body and take up lodging almost anywhere, and while on the way issue commands in the form of cytokines and chemokines and lymphokines, commands that affect many cell types in the body and which may also recursively induce further lymphopoiesis. One strong behavior pattern that captivates researchers and the public alike is the ability of lymphocytes to act as police, judge and executioner to kill other cells or demand that they suicide, a command that is usually obeyed. There seems to be no other sentencing option available.

Killers are distinguished from cells such as macrophages that eat other cells or munch debris by a method called phagocytosis. Killers do not use phagocytosis; they just kill and leave the clean-up to other cells.

Killers are known to attack virus-infected cells and cells that have become cancerous. Because of these abilities much research has been done into transforming these qualities into medical therapy, but progress has been slow.

Here is the parade of killers and how they work:

- Cytotoxic T cells

(also called Tc or antigen-specific cyto-lytic or -toxic T lymphocytes (CTL)). Tc kill by apoptosis and either splash their target with perforin or granzymes or else use Fas-Fasl Interaction to command target elimination. This kills cells that are infected and display antigen.

- NK cells (also called LGL (large granular lymphocytes))

These kill with exactly the same methods as Tc but have no interaction with any antigen. They select their targets based on typical molecules displayed by cells that are under stress by viral infection. NK Cells mainly are in the circulation (5-15% of the circulating lymphocytes) yet are also distributed in tissues everywhere.

- LAK cells (Lymphokine-activated killer) are a laboratory/clinical subset of NK Cells promoted by IL-2 to attack tumor cells.
- NKT cells see Natural Killer T cell main article

Natural Killer T Cells. Human NK T cells are a unique population (which express NK cell markers such as CD56 and KIR). NKT cells are thought to play an important role in tumor immunity and immunoregulation (Medical Immunology, p. 135), yet little is known. Recent evidence suggests a role working together with hepatic stellate cells being a liver-resident antigen-presenting cell that presents lipid antigens to and stimulates proliferation of NKT cells.

- Natural killer-like T cells

A heterogeneous group with ill-defined properties.

However, in summary there is no known cell or set of cells that is capable of killing cancerous cells in general.

=== Labeling lymphopoiesis ===
Because all WBCs are microscopic, colorless and often seemingly identical in appearance they are individually identified by their natural chemical markers, many of which have been analyzed and named. When two cells have the same markers, the reasonable assumption is made that the cells are identical at that time. A set of markers is colloquially described as the barcode for that cell or that cell line.

HSCs are technically described as: lacking FMS-like tyrosine kinase 3 (Flt3) and lacking the markers specific to discrete lymphoid lineages (Lin) but expressing high levels of Sca1 and c-kit; HSC also express CD44, low levels of Thy1.1 (CD90), but no IL-7Ra or CD27.

This is called the (surface) phenotype of an HSC. It can be expressed as a set (Lin2, Sca1high, c-kit high, CD44+, Thy1.1low, CD27 2, and IL-7Ra2). This set is a ‘barcode’ for the HSC, and is used to check, categorize and accumulate cells for many purposes often using laboratory methods such as cell flow cytometry. These barcodes partially define the modern meaning of phenotype for leukocytes.

Progression of HSC differentiation and lineage commitment is indicated by changes in this phenotype. That is, as the cell changes, the markers will also change, and the barcode will change.

- Typical barcodes for some cell types appearing in this article.

Cell Type	Barcode
ETP	C-Kit+, CD44+, CD25-
DN1	CD44+, CD25-
DN2	CD44+, CD25+

=== Knowledge development regarding lymphopoiesis ===
New questions emerge in immunology continuously as though there were a stem cell for questions. For example, it was thought that the process of lymphopoiesis was a direct, orderly unidirectional sequence. But it is not clear if end-stage lymphocytes come from progenitors that are homogeneous populations or overlapping populations. Nor is it clear whether lineages of lymphocytes develop via a continuum of differentiation with a progressive loss of lineage options or whether abrupt events result in the acquisition of certain properties.

Changes in cytoplasm, morphology of the cell nucleus, granules, cell internal biochemistry, signaling molecules and cell surface markers are difficult to correlate with definite stages in lymphopoiesis. The morphological differences do not just correspond to steps in mitosis (somatic cell division), but result from continuous "maturation processes" of the cell nucleus, as well as of the cytoplasm and so one must not be too rigid about morphological distinctions between certain cell stages.

- Models and updates on the lymphopoiesis family tree

Until recently the model of the CMP generating all myeloid cell and the CLP generating all lymphoid cells was considered necessary and sufficient to explain the known facts observed in the generation of WBCs, and it is still found in most basic textbooks. However, beginning around 2000 and gaining momentum after 2005 in both studies in humans and mice, new complexities were noted and published in papers. These studies are important now mainly to immunology researchers but are likely to eventually lead to changes in medical treatments.

The changes were sparked by observations that lymphopoiesis did not always break into two lineages at the level of the CLP. Worse, some macrophages (long considered a myeloid lineage) could be generated by lymphoid lineage progenitors. In essence focus has been shifted away from the CLP to the MLP (lymphoid-specified progenitors), which are clearly lymphoid progenitors yet retain some myeloid potential, particularly the ability in both humans and mice to make macrophages – one of the most versatile of immune cell defenders – and also many dendritic cells, the best 'watchdogs' of antigen invaders.

However, the process of lymphopoiesis always seems to relentlessly give rise to progeny with special attributes and abilities, but with progressively more restricted lymphoid developmental potential.

== Stages of development ==
=== The old model: lymphoid vs myeloid ===
This model of lymphopoiesis had the virtue of relative simplicity, agreement with nomenclature and terminology, and is still essentially valid for the laboratory mouse.

1. pHSC pluripotent, self-renewing, hematopoietic stem cells which give rise to
2. MPP multipotent progenitors, which give rise to
3. ELP (or PRO) Prolymphocytes, early lymphoid progenitors, and finally to the
4. CLP Common lymphoid progenitor, a cell type fully committed to the lymphoid lineage.

pHSC, MPP and ELP cells are not fully committed to the lymphoid lineage because if one is removed to a different location it may differentiate into non-lymphoid progeny. However CLP are committed to the lymphoid lineage. The CLP is the transit cell responsible for these (generally parallel) stages of development, below:

- NK cells
- Dendritic cells (lymphoid lineage; DC2)
- Progenitor B cells
  - Pro-B cells => Early Pro (or pre-pre)-B cells => Late Pro (or pre-pre)-B cells
  - Large Pre-B cells => Small Pre-B cells
  - Immature B cells
  - B Cells => (B1 cells; B2 cells)
    - Plasma cells
- Pro-T cells
  - T-cells

==== Research on new models (not mice) ====
By 2008 it was found that "the majority of early thymic progenitor [ETP] cells do not commit to becoming T cells by the time they get to the thymus gland. ETP cells retained the ability to become either T cells or myeloid cells."

See also :

=== Graphical view of the old model vs mixed lymphoid and myeloid model ===
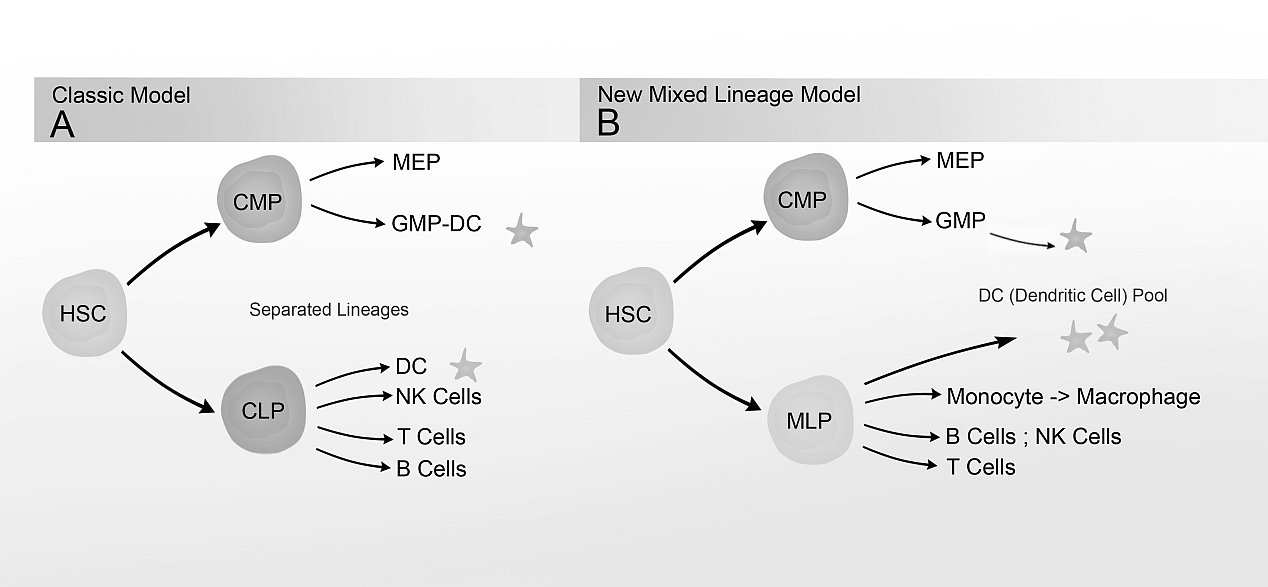
Side by side. Comparing the new and old lineage models.

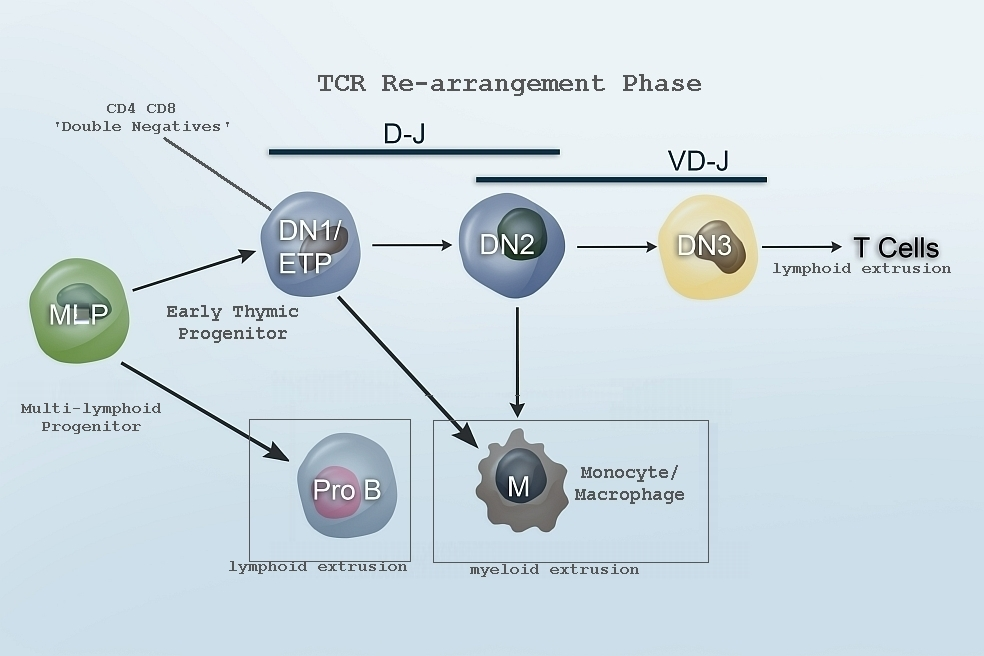
Revised Lineage lymphoid and myeloid flowchart.

== General immunology reference texts ==
Texts in bold are the most heavily cited in this article.

- Cell Communication in Nervous and Immune System; Gundelfinger, Seidenbecher, Schraven; Springer Berlin Heidelberg New York; 2006; ISBN 3-540-36828-0
- Color Atlas of Hematology; Theml et al.; Thieme; 2004; ISBN 1-58890-193-9
- Dynamics of Cancer; Steven A. Frank; Princeton University Press, Princeton, New Jersey; 2007; ISBN 978-0-691-13366-9, Creative Commons Public License
- Fundamental Immunology, 5th edition; William E. Paul (Editor); Lippincott Williams & Wilkins Publishers; 2003; ISBN 0-7817-3514-9
- Immuno-Biology: The Immune System in Health and Science, 6th Edition; Janeway, Travers; 2005; Garland Science Publishing, New York; ISBN 0-8153-4101-6
- Immunology Introductory Textbook (ebook;revised 2nd edition); Nandini Shetty; New Age International (P) Limited, Publishers, India; 2005; ISBN 81-224-2335-3
- **Instant Notes in Immunology**, 2nd ed.; Lydyard, Whelan, Fanger; Taylor and Francis Group; 2004; China Version ISBN 978-7-03-025225-8； 46RMB Wangfujing Bookstore
- **Medical Immunology**—6th ed.; G. Virella, Editor; Informa Healthcare USA, Inc; 2007; ISBN 978-0-8493-9696-0
- Stem Cell Biology; Marshak, Gardner, Gottlieb; Cold Spring Harbor Laboratory Press; 2001; ISBN 0-87969-575-7/01
- **Textbook of Human Development and Histology**; Zhong Cuiping et al.; Shanghai Scientific and Technical Publishers; 2006; ISBN 7-5323-8230-3
- **Textbook of Medical Immunology** (Immunology, 7th Edition); LIM Pak Leong; Elsevier (Singapore) Pte Ltd.; 2006; ISBN 0-323-03399-7

== Additional images ==
Alternate views of lineages

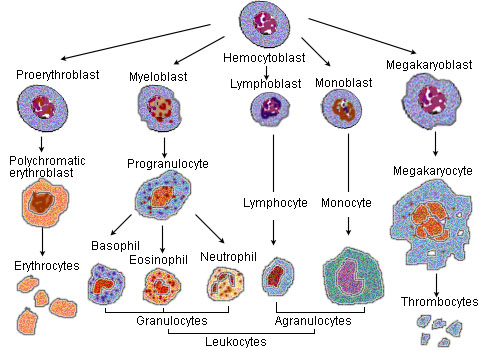
Blood cell lineage. For scale, note that megakaryocytes (50-100 μm) are 10 to 15 times larger than a typical red blood cell.

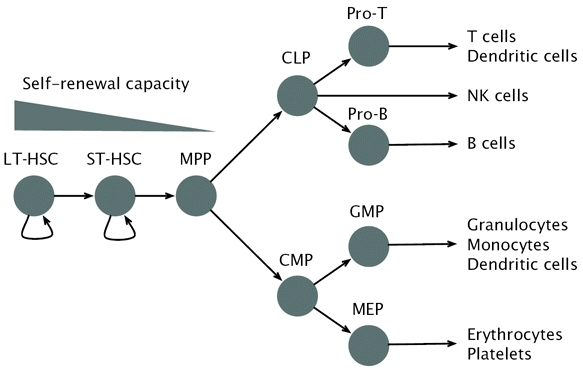
Blood cell lineage. Based on self-renewal ability.

Schematic view. Well-defined lineages.

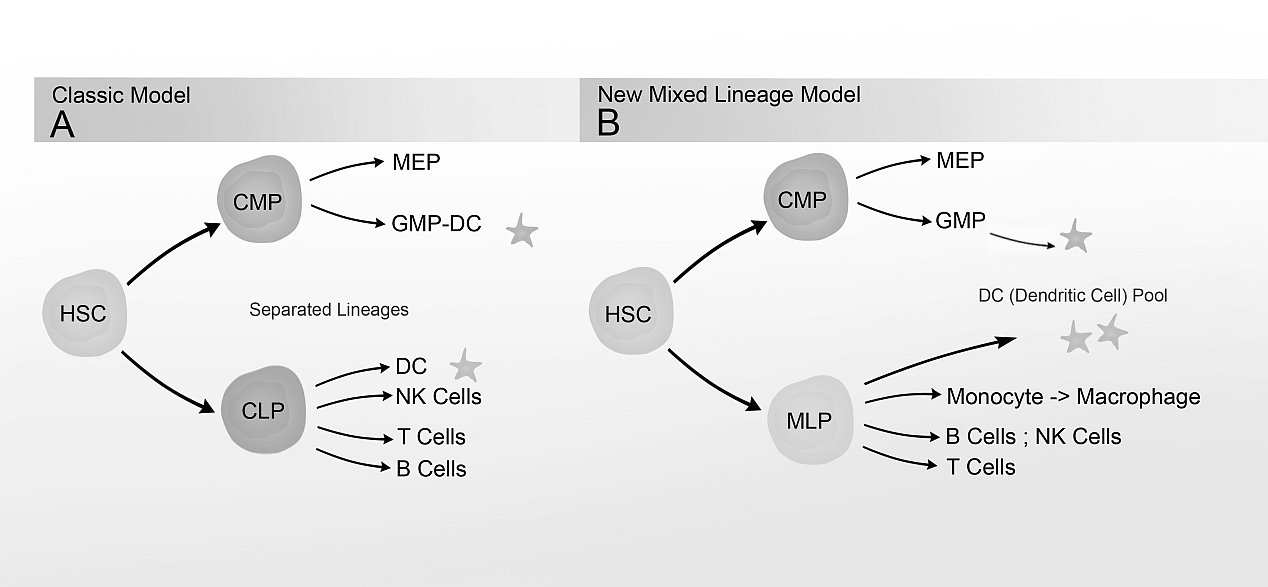
Side by side. Comparing the new and old lineage models.
