= Follicular B cell =

Type of immune cell important for T-cell-dependent antibody responses to proteins

Within the immune system, follicular B cells (FO B cells) are a type of B cell that reside in primary and secondary lymphoid follicles (containing germinal centers) of secondary and tertiary lymphoid organs, including spleen and lymph nodes. Antibody responses against proteins are believed to involve follicular B cell pathways in secondary lymphoid organs.

Mature B cells from the spleen can be divided into two main populations: FO B cells, which constitute the majority, and marginal zone B-cells, lining outside the marginal sinus and bordering the red pulp. FO B cells express high levels of IgD, and CD23; lower levels of CD21 and IgM; and no CD1 or CD5, readily distinguishing this compartment from B1 B cells and marginal zone B-cells. FO B cells organize into the primary follicles of B cell zones focused around follicular dendritic cells in the white pulp of the spleen and the cortical areas of peripheral lymph nodes. Multiphoton-based live imaging of lymph nodes indicate continuous movement of FO B cells within these follicular areas at velocities of ~6 μm per min. Recent studies indicate movement along the processes of FDC as a guidance system for mature resting B cells in peripheral lymph nodes. Unlike their MZ counterpart, FO B cells freely recirculate, comprising >95% of the B cells in peripheral lymph nodes.

The BCR repertoire of the follicular B cell compartment also appears under positive selection pressures during final maturation in the spleen. However, diversity is substantially broader than B1 B and MZ B cell compartments. More importantly, FO B cells require CD40-CD40L dependent T_{FH} cell help to promote effective primary immune responses and antibody isotype switching and to establish high-affinity B cell memory.
