= Transitional B cell =

Transitional B cells are B cells at an intermediate stage in their development between bone marrow immature cells and mature B cells in the spleen. Primary B cell development takes place in the bone marrow, where immature B cells must generate a functional B cell receptor (BCR) and overcome negative selection induced by reactivity with autoantigens. Transitional cells can be found in the bone marrow, peripheral blood, and spleen, and only a fraction of the immature B cells that survive after the transitional stage become mature B cells in secondary lymphoid organs such as the spleen.

== Characteristics of transitional cells ==
The term "transitional B cell" was first used in 1995 for cells that are developmentally intermediate between immature bone marrow B lineage cells and fully mature naïve B cells in the peripheral blood and secondary lymphoid tissues, found in mice. In humans, it is postulated that the transitional cells, after leaving the bone marrow, are subjected to peripheral checks to prevent the production of autoantibodies. Transitional B cells that survive selection against autoreactivity develop eventually into naive B cells. Given the fact that only a small fraction of immature B cells survive the transition to the mature naive stage, the transitional B cell compartment is widely believed to represent a key negative selection checkpoint for autoreactive B cells. All transitional B cells are high in heat-stable antigen (HSA, CD24) relative to their mature counterparts and express the phenotypic surface markers AA4.

== T1 and T2 ==
There are two transitional stages for the B cells in mouse, T1 and T2, with the T1 stage occurring from its migration from the bone marrow to its entry into the spleen, and the T2 stage occurring within the spleen where they developed into mature B cells. As in the mouse, human transitional cells can be found in the bone marrow, peripheral blood, and spleen. However, in contrast to the nuanced models proposed in the mouse, thus far human studies have, by and large, described a rather homogeneous population of transitional B cells (T1/T2) defined by the expression of high levels of CD24, CD38 and CD10.

Overall there is general agreement on the markers used to separate the subpopulations, although some differences exist in the number of subgroups and in the functional characteristics of the T2 population. T1 B cells are distinguished from the other subsets by the following surface marker characteristics: they are IgM^{hi}IgD^{−}CD21^{−}CD23^{−}, whereas T2 B cells retain high levels of surface IgM but are also IgD^{+}CD21^{+} and CD23^{+}. Differences in functional characteristics of the T2 subpopulation reported by different laboratories are unexplained, although they might be due to differences in isolation strategies. In any case, there is consensus that T2 B cells clearly differ functionally from T1 B cells.

== See also ==
- Immune tolerance
