= SSC4D =

Protein-coding gene in the species Homo sapiens

Identifiers
- Aliases: SSC4D, S4D-SRCRB, SRCRB-S4D, SRCRB4D, scavenger receptor cysteine rich family member with 4 domains
- External IDs: OMIM: 607639; MGI: 1924709; GeneCards: SSC4D

Gene location (Human)
Chr.	Chromosome 7 (human)
Band	7q11.23	Start	76,389,334 bp
Band	7q11.23	End	76,409,697 bp

Gene location (Mouse)
Chr.	Chromosome 5 (mouse)
Band	5|5 G2	Start	135,989,065 bp
Band	5|5 G2	End	136,003,385 bp
RNA expression pattern
Bgee	Human / Mouse (ortholog); Top expressed in: parotid gland; testicle; gonad; middle temporal gyrus; deltoid muscle; tibialis anterior muscle; thalamus; pons; internal globus pallidus; pars compacta / Top expressed in: vestibular sensory epithelium; otolith organ; utricle; granulocyte; otic vesicle; primary oocyte; zygote; stria vascularis; secondary oocyte; vestibular membrane of cochlear duct; More reference expression data
BioGPS	n/a
Gene ontology
Molecular function	scavenger receptor activity
Cellular component	membrane; extracellular region; external side of plasma membrane
Biological process	receptor-mediated endocytosis; vesicle-mediated transport; endocytosis
Sources:Amigo / QuickGO
Orthologs
Databases	NCBI: entry; OMA: entry
Species	Human	Mouse
Entrez	136853	109267
Ensembl	ENSG00000146700	ENSMUSG00000029699
UniProt	Q8WTU2	A1L0T3
RefSeq (mRNA)	NM_080744	NM_001160366
RefSeq (protein)	NP_542782	NP_001153838
Location (UCSC)	Chr 7: 76.39 – 76.41 Mb	Chr 5: 135.99 – 136 Mb
PubMed search
- Wikidata
View/Edit Human	View/Edit Mouse

Scavenger receptor cysteine rich family member with 4 domains is a protein that in humans is encoded by the SSC4D gene.

== Function ==
The scavenger receptor cysteine-rich (SRCR) superfamily is an ancient and highly conserved group of cell surface and/or secreted proteins, some of which are involved in the development of the immune system and the regulation of both innate and adaptive immune responses. Group B SRCR domains usually contain 8 regularly spaced cysteines that give rise to a well-defined intradomain disulfide-bond pattern.
