= Follicular cell =

Follicular cell may refer to:

- Thyroid follicular cell, found in the thyroid gland
- Granulosa cell, found in the follicles around oocytes
- Follicular dendritic cell, found in the follicles of lymphoid tissue
- Follicular B cell, found in the follicles of lymphoid tissue

== See also ==
- Follicle (anatomy)
