= Ian MacLennan =

Ian MacLennan may refer to:

- Ian Roy MacLennan (1919–2013), Canadian fighter pilot and architect
- Ian Calman Muir MacLennan, professor of immunology
- Ian Maclennan (diplomat), British diplomat

== See also ==
- Sir Ian McLennan (1909–1998), Australian director of public companies
