= Peptidase 1 (mite) =

Class of enzymes found in mites

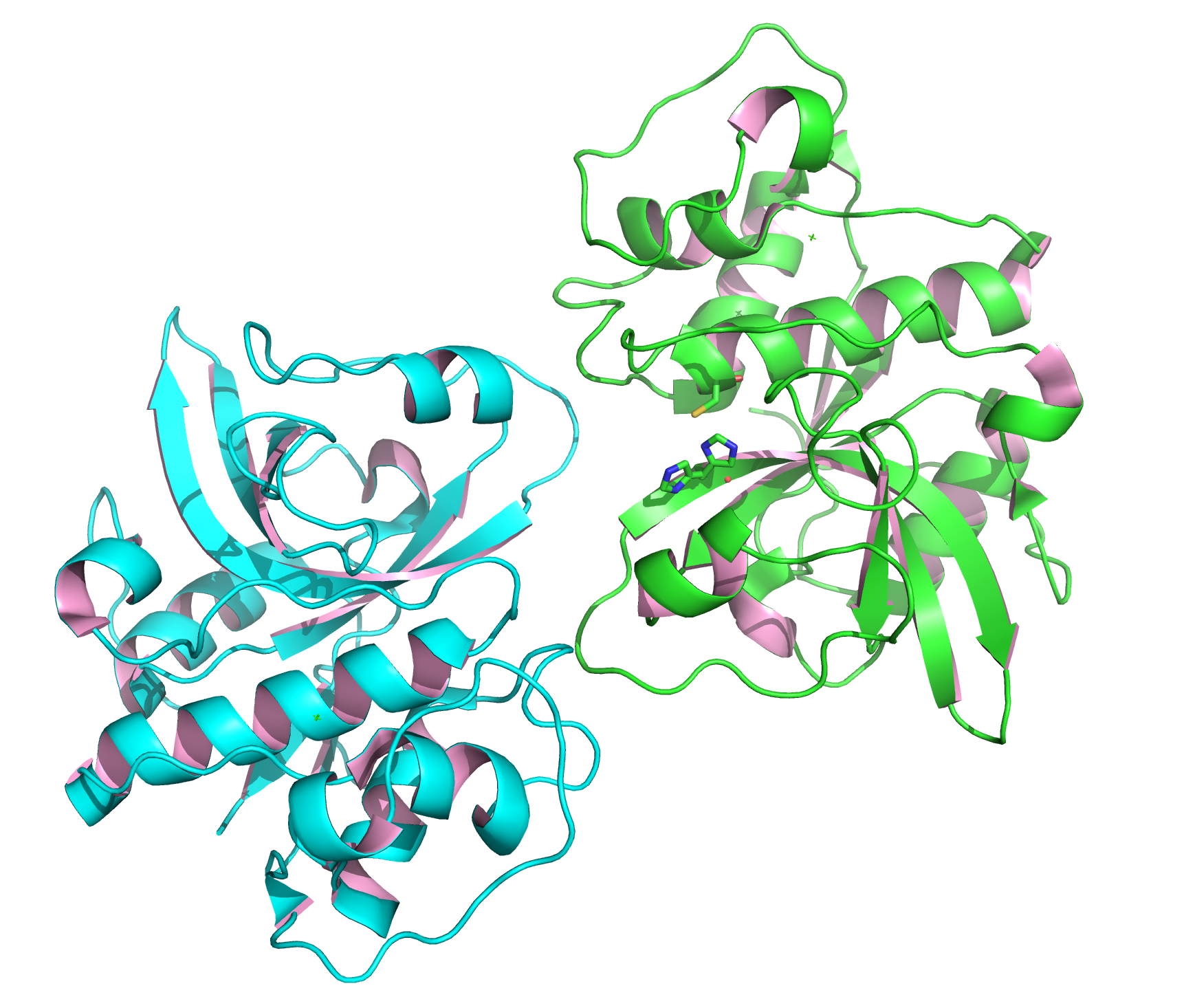
- Crystal structure of Der p 1 allergen from pdb entry 3F5V

Identifiers
- EC no.: 3.4.22.65

Databases
- IntEnz: IntEnz view
- BRENDA: BRENDA entry
- ExPASy: NiceZyme view
- KEGG: KEGG entry
- MetaCyc: metabolic pathway
- PRIAM: profile
- PDB structures: RCSB PDB PDBe PDBsum
Search
- PMC: articles
- PubMed: articles
- NCBI: proteins

Peptidase 1 (mite) (EC 3.4.22.65), also known as endopeptidase 1 (mite), is an enzyme found in various species of mites. This enzyme exhibits cysteine protease activity with broad endopeptidase specificity.

The various forms of peptidase 1 pertaining to individual mite species comprise the group 1 mite allergens. Following the naming conventions of allergens, these peptidase 1 variants include Der p 1 of the European house dust mite Dermatophagoides pteronyssinus; Der f 1 of the American house dust mite Dermatophagoides farinae; Eur m 1 of the Mayne's house dust mite Euroglyphus maynei; and Pso o 1 of the sheep scab mite Psoroptes ovis. The group 1 mite allergens, especially Der p 1 and Der f 1, are major sources of house dust mite (HDM) allergies in temperate climates.

== History ==
The first allergen to be purified and characterized was Der p 1, in a 1980 study by Martin D. Chapman and Thomas Platts-Mills. By the end of the decade, it was suspected that Der p 1 was a cysteine protease when its structure showed similarities to that of actinidin and papain. In the mid-1990s, Hewitt et al., Shakib et al., and King et al. proposed methods of Der p 1 promoting allergic responses through its protease activities.

In 2002, Pso o 1 was identified and characterized by Lee et al., who determined its amino acid sequence and found it to be homologous to the other group 1 mite allergens.

In 2009, Der f 1 was the first observed instance of a natural allergen in the form of a monomer.

== Structure ==
Peptidase 1 is a cysteine protease belonging to the C1 protein family, with a structure similar to that of papain. Initially, peptidase 1 is synthesized as an inactive zymogen, which is activated by enzymatic cleavage.

Structurally, peptidase 1 enzymes are nearly identical; for example, a two-domain structure and an approximate 81% sequence identity are retained between Der p 1 and Der f 1. Due to the conserved structures, a single allergen may be used as a model in the development of drugs intended to target group 1 mite allergens, with Der p 1 usually considered the archetype. Specificity and cross-reactivity between multiple group 1 allergens is thought to stem from the differences and homologies in structure, particularly regarding the positions of epitopes.

=== Der p 1 ===
Peptidase 1

Identifiers
- Organism: Dermatophagoides pteronyssinus
- Symbol: DERP1
- PDB: 1XKG
- UniProt: P08176
Search for
- Structures: Swiss-model
- Domains: InterPro

Der p 1 is a 25 kDa glycoprotein composed of a 222-amino acid sequence encoded by the gene DERP1. Der p 1 is synthesized as an inactive 80-amino acid protein precursor known as proDer p 1, which is then cleaved and activated by mature Der p 1.

Due to its cysteine protease structure, Der p 1 may be irreversibly inhibited by E-64 or iodoacetamide, which bind to the cysteine active site and block substrate access.

The major kiwifruit cysteine proteinase inhibitor KCPI1 has also been shown to be able to inhibit Der p 1. Patients sensitised to Der p 1 may experience allergy symptoms after eating foods containing cysteine proteases, such as fig, papaya, pineapple, and kiwi.

=== Der f 1 ===
Peptidase 1

Identifiers
- Organism: Dermatophagoides farinae
- Symbol: DERF1
- PDB: 3RVV
- UniProt: P16311
Search for
- Structures: Swiss-model
- Domains: InterPro

Der f 1 is a 25 kDa protease composed of a 223-amino acid sequence. In its inactive precursor state, proDer f 1 has an 80-amino acid prodomain.

Unlike Der p 1, Der f 1 lacks binding sites for metals such as magnesium and calcium. Through secretion by Pichia pastoris, Der f 1 is easier to produce in a recombinant form than Der p 1 due to the removal of an N-glycosylation site. In solution or crystal, Der f 1 is a monomer. Der f 1 has been shown to express polymorphism, with at least two haplotypes observed in different regions.

Der f 1 can be inhibited by chestnut cystatin, which is thought to stem from the presence of the amino acid Gln^{152} (instead of Der p 1's Arg^{151}) near the enzyme's active site.

=== Eur m 1 ===
Peptidase 1

Identifiers
- Organism: Euroglyphus maynei
- Symbol: EURM1
- UniProt: P25780
Search for
- Structures: Swiss-model
- Domains: InterPro

Eur m 1 is composed of a 223-amino acid sequence. In its inactive precursor state, Eur m 1 has an 80-amino acid prodomain.

Eur m 1 shares 88% identity with Der f 1, which has led to the proposal that Euroglyphus maynei may be more closely related to Dermatophagoides farinae than Dermatophagoides pteronyssinus.

=== Pso o 1 ===
Peptidase 1

Identifiers
- Organism: Psoroptes ovis
- Symbol: PSOO1
- UniProt: Q1EIQ3
Search for
- Structures: Swiss-model
- Domains: InterPro

Pso o 1 is a 36 kDa protease composed of a 223-amino acid sequence. Pso o 1's precursor form is thought to be composed of an 81-amino acid sequence.

Compared to other forms of peptidase 1, Pso o 1 shares 54% identity with Der f 1, 53% identity with Der p 1, and 53% identity with Eur m 1. A number of amino acid sequences from other peptidase 1 enzymes are shown to be conserved in Pso o 1, including enzymatic amino acids, a N-glycosylation site, and the Der p 1 epitope Leu^{147}-Gln^{160}.

== Biological function ==
Peptidase 1 enzymes are found in the fecal pellets of mites. Some of these enzymes have also been located in the mite gut, suggesting that these enzymes play a role in digestion. As a cysteine protease, peptidase 1 functions by cleaving other mite proteases in a biochemical cascade that results in the activation of other allergens.

Mite fecal pellets carrying peptidase 1 enter the respiratory tract through inhalation. There, as group 1 mite allergens, peptidase 1 enzymes promote allergic sensitization, usually either by causing epithelial leakage in the respiratory tract through cleavage of the cells' tight junctions or by triggering innate chemokine release through activation of signal transduction pathways.

=== Der p 1 ===
Der p 1 is located in the mid-gut and fecal pellets of the European house dust mite Dermatophagoides pteronyssinus. It has been suggested that the mite's gastrointestinal cells produce Der p 1. In the mite, Der p 1 is responsible for the activation of zymogens located in the mite digestive tract, including itself and the serine proteases Der p 3, Der p 6, and Der p 9, which are then secreted as potent allergens and thereby increase the pathogenesis of the allergy.

Der p 1 is a major source of HDM allergies, triggering immunoglobulin E binding levels of 80-90% and, combined with the group 2 allergen Der p 2, accounting for over 50% of all HDM-related IgE binding. CD23 and CD25 are targets of Der p 1, which cleaves these receptors from the surfaces of active B cells and T cells, respectively, and thereby triggers the release of more IgE. This protein is also able to damage epithelial and surfactant proteins in lung tissue. Such activity promotes the entrance of other house dust mite proteins through airway epithelium and may result in sensitisation to them. Because of the prevalence of Der p 1 in mite allergies, developers of HDM allergy vaccines consider it necessary to factor in Der p 1. As a result, Der p 1 is a major component of mite allergen crude extracts and is frequently used as the basis of numerous hypoallergenic derivatives created in the refinement of specific immunotherapy. Even by inhibiting only Der p 1, allergic responses may be noticeably alleviated.

Patients sensitised to Der p 1 may experience allergy symptoms after eating foods containing cysteine proteases, such as fig, papaya, pineapple, and kiwi.

=== Der f 1 ===
Der f 1 is found in the fecal pellets of the American house dust mite Dermatophagoides farinae. Der f 1 is considered a major mite allergen and has been shown to promote allergic reactions in the lungs and skin. Der f 1 shows over 80% cross-reactivity with Der p 1. Like Der p 1, Der f 1 functions by cleaving CD23 to trigger an IgE response. Der f 1 also triggers an immune response through eosinophil degranulation.

=== Eur m 1 ===
Eur m 1 is secreted by the Mayne's house dust mite Euroglyphus maynei. Eur m 1 provokes allergic responses from T cells. Der p 1 and Der f 1 show only low levels of cross-reactivity with Eur m 1.

=== Pso o 1 ===
Pso o 1 is found in the gut and fecal pellets of the sheep scab mite Psoroptes ovis. Psoroptic mange in sheep is promoted by the cysteine protease activity of Pso o 1, which targets connective tissues and the molecules of the extracellular matrix. Although Psoroptes belongs to a different order from the house dust mite species, Pso o 1 is classified as a group 1 mite allergen alongside Der p 1, Der f 1, and Eur m 1.
