= ZNF318 =

Protein-coding gene in humans

Identifiers
- Aliases: ZNF318, TZF, ZFP318, HRIHFB2436, zinc finger protein 318
- External IDs: OMIM: 617512; MGI: 1889348; GeneCards: ZNF318

Gene location (Human)
Chr.	Chromosome 6 (human)
Band	6p21.1	Start	43,307,134 bp
Band	6p21.1	End	43,369,647 bp

Gene location (Mouse)
Chr.	Chromosome 17 (mouse)
Band	17|17 C	Start	46,694,657 bp
Band	17|17 C	End	46,731,846 bp
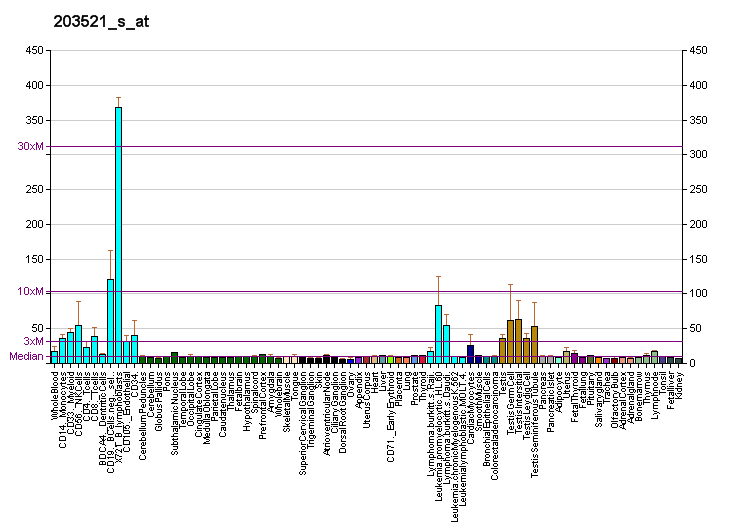

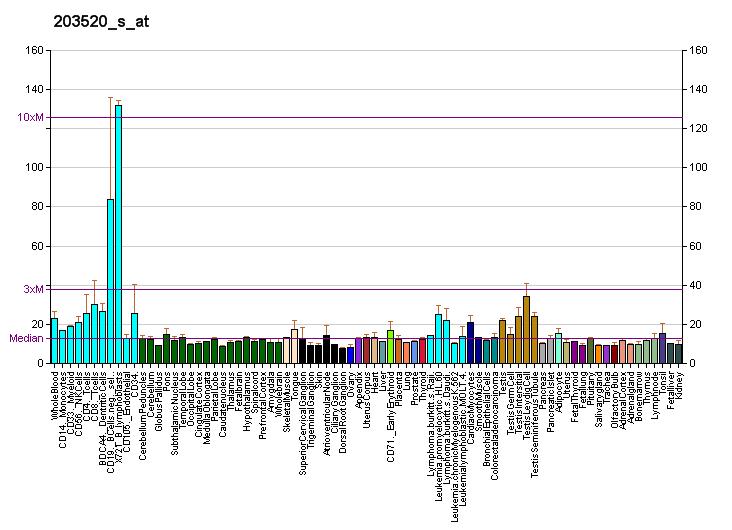
RNA expression pattern
Bgee	Human / Mouse (ortholog); Top expressed in: left testis; right testis; testicle; right hemisphere of cerebellum; gonad; granulocyte; secondary oocyte; apex of heart; lymph node; sural nerve / Top expressed in: tail of embryo; saccule; genital tubercle; secondary oocyte; zygote; neural layer of retina; otic vesicle; testicle; spermatocyte; mesenteric lymph nodes; More reference expression data
BioGPS	More reference expression data
Gene ontology
Molecular function	zinc ion binding; metal ion binding; nucleic acid binding; protein homodimerization activity
Cellular component	nucleus; nucleoplasm; cytosol
Biological process	regulation of transcription, DNA-templated; meiosis; transcription, DNA-templated; negative regulation of transcription, DNA-templated; positive regulation of transcription, DNA-templated
Sources:Amigo / QuickGO
Orthologs
Databases	NCBI: entry; OMA: entry
Species	Human	Mouse
Entrez	24149	57908
Ensembl	ENSG00000171467	ENSMUSG00000015597
UniProt	Q5VUA4	Q99PP2
RefSeq (mRNA)	NM_014345	NM_021346; NM_207671
RefSeq (protein)	NP_055160	NP_067321; NP_997554
Location (UCSC)	Chr 6: 43.31 – 43.37 Mb	Chr 17: 46.69 – 46.73 Mb
PubMed search
- Wikidata
View/Edit Human	View/Edit Mouse

Zinc finger protein 318 is a zinc finger protein that in humans is encoded by the ZNF318 gene. It has a role in the promotion of immunoglobulin D expression and in controlling the alternative splicing of the long pre-mRNA.
