= Ian Calman Muir MacLennan =

British immunologist

- Born: 30 December 1939 (age 86)
- Known for: contributions to immunology discovered marginal zone B-cells
- Awards: FRS (2012)
- Scientific career
- Fields: Immunology
- Workplaces: University of Birmingham

Ian Calman Muir MacLennan, CBE, FRS, is Emeritus Professor of Immunology at the University of Birmingham MRC Centre for Immune Regulation in Birmingham, UK.

He was born on 30 December 1939. He has made pioneering contributions to immunology and was the first to discover marginal zone B-cells.

He was made a Commander of the Order of the British Empire in the Queen's Birthday Honours in 2005. He was elected a Fellow of the Royal Society (FRS) in 2012, his nomination reads:

Ian MacLennan has made several landmark contributions to immunology and especially our understanding of antibody production. His classic experiments led him propose a role for germinal centres in affinity maturation of antibody responses by a process of hypermutation followed by antigen-mediated selection. Subsequently, he identified the basis of the multi-step selection process that protects against autoantibody production. He also first discovered marginal zone B cells and identified how they counter encapsulated bacterial infection. His early work revealed and characterized the cells now termed NK cells and their capacity to kill antibody-coated nucleated cells.
