= CD5 (protein) =

Protein found in humans

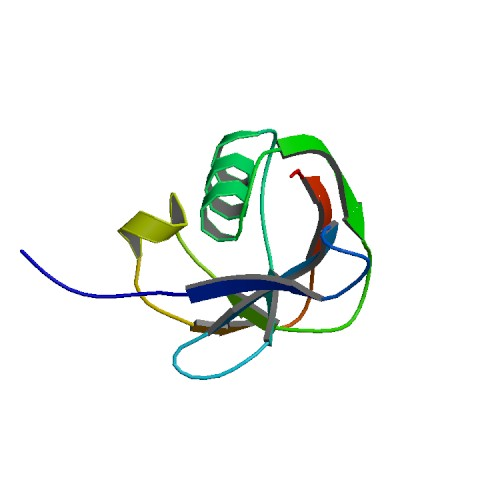

Identifiers
- Aliases: CD5, LEU1, T1, CD5 molecule
- External IDs: OMIM: 153340; MGI: 88340; GeneCards: CD5
Available structures
PDB	Ortholog search: PDBe RCSB
PDB	List of PDB id codes 2JA4, 2JOP, 2JP0, 2OTT

Gene location (Human)
Chr.	Chromosome 11 (human)
Band	11q12.2	Start	61,102,489 bp
Band	11q12.2	End	61,127,852 bp

Gene location (Mouse)
Chr.	Chromosome 19 (mouse)
Band	19 A|19 7.16 cM	Start	10,694,480 bp
Band	19 A|19 7.16 cM	End	10,716,366 bp
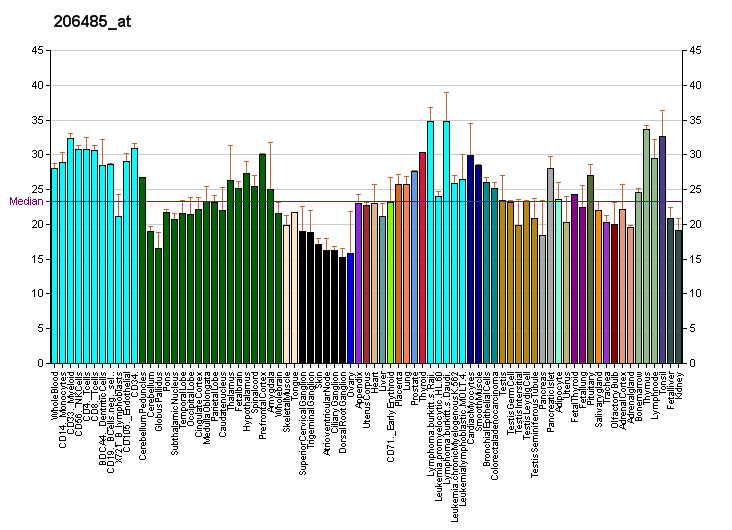
RNA expression pattern
Bgee	Human / Mouse (ortholog); Top expressed in: granulocyte; lymph node; blood; appendix; tonsil; testicle; spleen; bone marrow cell; gallbladder; thymus / Top expressed in: thymus; mesenteric lymph nodes; blood; embryo; spleen; secondary oocyte; primary oocyte; esophagus; embryo; lip; More reference expression data
BioGPS	More reference expression data
Gene ontology
Molecular function	scavenger receptor activity; protein binding; transmembrane signaling receptor activity; signaling receptor activity
Cellular component	integral component of membrane; plasma membrane; integral component of plasma membrane; membrane; external side of plasma membrane
Biological process	apoptotic signaling pathway; T cell costimulation; cell population proliferation; cell recognition; receptor-mediated endocytosis; vesicle-mediated transport; endocytosis
Sources:Amigo / QuickGO
Orthologs
Databases	NCBI: entry; OMA: entry
Species	Human	Mouse
Entrez	921	12507
Ensembl	ENSG00000110448	ENSMUSG00000024669
UniProt	P06127	P13379
RefSeq (mRNA)	NM_014207; NM_001346456	NM_007650
RefSeq (protein)	NP_001333385; NP_055022	NP_031676
Location (UCSC)	Chr 11: 61.1 – 61.13 Mb	Chr 19: 10.69 – 10.72 Mb
PubMed search
- Wikidata
View/Edit Human	View/Edit Mouse

CD5 is a cluster of differentiation expressed on the surface of T cells (various species) and in a subset of murine B cells known as B-1a. The expression of this receptor in human B cells has been a controversial topic and to date there is no consensus regarding the role of this receptor as a marker of human B cells. B-1 cells have limited diversity of their B-cell receptor due to their lack of the enzyme terminal deoxynucleotidyl transferase (TdT) and are potentially self-reactive. CD5 serves to mitigate activating signals from the BCR so that the B-1 cells can only be activated by very strong stimuli (such as bacterial antigen) and not by normal tissue antigen. CD5 was used as a T-cell marker until monoclonal antibodies against CD3 were developed.

In humans, the gene is located on the long arm of chromosome 11. There is no confirmed ligand for CD5 but there is evidence that CD72, a C-type lectin, may be a ligand or that CD5 may be homophilic, binding CD5 on the surface of other cells. CD5 includes a scavenger receptor cysteine-rich protein domain.

T cells express higher levels of CD5 than B cells. CD5 is upregulated on T cells upon strong activation. In the thymus, there is a correlation with CD5 expression and strength of the interaction of the T cell towards self-peptides.

== Immunohistochemistry ==
CD5 is a good immunohistochemical marker for T-cells, although not as sensitive as CD3. About 76% of T-cell neoplasms are reported to express CD5, and it is also found in chronic lymphocytic leukemia and mantle cell lymphoma (both being B cell malignancies), that do not express CD3. It is commonly lost in cutaneous T-cell lymphoma, and its absence can be used as an indicator of malignancy in this condition. The absence of CD5 in T cell acute lymphoblastic leukemia, while relatively rare, is associated with a poor prognosis.
