= B1 cell =

B cell lymphocytes

B1 cells are a sub-class of B cell lymphocytes that are involved in the humoral immune response. They are not part of the adaptive immune system, as they have no memory, but otherwise, B1 cells perform many of the same roles as other B cells: making antibodies against antigens and acting as antigen-presenting cells. B-1 cells are classified as innate-like lymphocytes due to their T cell independent activation. They express high levels of Toll-like receptors (TLRs), TLR4 in particular, which recognizes lipopolysaccharide (LPS) from Gram-negative bacteria. B-1 cell TLR binding of LPS results in B-1 cell division and differentiation into IgM-secreting plasma cells without T_{H} cell help. These B1 cells are commonly found in peripheral sites, but less commonly found in the blood. These cells are involved in antibody response during an infection or vaccination. B-1 cells also respond to cytokine signals from other innate immune cells, like mast cells. Receptors for IL-5 promote B-1 cell survival and antibody secretion. This allows coordination of B-1 response with broader inflammatory events at sites of infection.

There are two types of B1 cells subsets, B1a cells and B1b cells. B1b cells have been shown to be capable of memory responses. B1b cells also can recognize protective antigens in bacteria, which is unique because they are targeting something internal.

== Origin ==
B1 cells are first produced in the fetus and most B1 cells undergo self-renewal in the periphery, unlike conventional B cells (B2 cells) that are produced after birth and replaced in the bone marrow. B1 cells are present in low numbers in the lymph nodes and spleen, as they are instead found predominantly in serous cavities lined with serous membranes, including the peritoneum and pleura. Here they reside and maintain a self-renewing population. Following activation, they migrate into secondary lymphatic organs and differentiate into plasma cells.

== Types ==
Human B1 cells have been found to have marker profile of CD20+CD27+CD43+CD70- and could either be CD5+ or CD5-, which has been debated since. CD5-CD72 is thought to mediate B cell-B cell interaction. What differentiates B1 cells from other B cells is the variable existence of CD5, CD86, IgM and IgD. B-1 B cells, in the mouse, can be further subdivided into B-1a (CD5^{+}) and B-1b (CD5^{−}) subtypes. Unlike B-1a B cells, the B-1b subtype can be generated from precursors in the adult bone marrow. The B1a and B1b precursors have been reported to differ in the expression levels of CD138.

Compared to B1a cells, B1b cells seem to recognize more types of antigens including intracellular antigens. Previously, B1b cell antigen recognition was thought to be random; however, recent research indicated that B1b cells specifically target a variety of protective antigens, also called conserved factors, over other types antigens.

Recent functional studies indicate a further subdivision of labor assigning B1a cells as the producers of natural serum antibody (7). In contrast, B1b cells appear to be the primary source of dynamic T cell independent (TI) antibody production and long-term protection after bacterial infection such as Borrelia hermsii and Streptococcus pneumoniae. These studies indicate preexisting subset differences in B-cell receptor (BCR) specificity and antigen-driven B cell fate that remain important unresolved features of the system.

B1a derived cells have a subset named innate response activator(IRA) B cells. IRA B cells produce GM-CSF and IL-3. In atherosclerosis, they accumulate in spleen. This results in extramedullary hematopoiesis and activating dendritic cell.

== Role in immune response ==
B1b cells are the most common B cells involved in antibody response during an infection or vaccination. This is because they can respond without receiving an activation signal from a T Helper cell.

B1 cells express IgM in greater quantities than IgG and its receptors show polyspecificity, meaning that they have low affinities for many different antigens. These polyspecific immunoglobulins often have a preference for other immunoglobulins, self antigens and common bacterial polysaccharides. B1 cells are present in low numbers in the lymph nodes and spleen and are instead found predominantly in the peritoneal and pleural cavities. B1 cells generate diversity mainly via recombinatorial recombination (there is a preferential recombination between D-proximal VH gene segments).

B1 cells characteristically express high levels of surface IgM (sIgM), demonstrable CD11b, and low levels of surface IgD (sIgD), CD21, CD23, and the B cell isoform of CD45R (B220). In adult mice, B1 cells constitute a minor fraction of the spleen and secondary lymphoid tissues but are enriched in the pleural and peritoneal cavities.^{,} B1 cells were shown to arise from precursors in the fetal liver and neonatal but not adult bone marrow and constitute the earliest wave of mature peripheral B cells.

B1 cells express a separable BCR repertoire. Sequence analysis indicates antibodies with restricted sets of V region genes and an increased usage of λ light chains. B1 cells sequences also show no evidence for somatic hypermutation (SHM), and few non-templated nucleotide (N) sequence insertions, a pattern typical of neonatal B cells. Efficient B1 B cell development appears to be dependent on positive regulators of BCR signaling and the loss of negative regulators promotes greater accumulation of B1 B cells. Hence, there appears to be a role for self or foreign antigen in shaping the repertoire of the B-1 B cell compartment. The B cell receptor (BCR) on B-1 cells express a repertoire which is more likely to recognize highly repetitive sequences on epitopes of antigens found on bacterial surfaces and are also polyreactive due to their lower specificity. Cross-linking activation due to the binding of multivalent antigens (antigens expressing many identical epitopes) with multiple nearby BCRs generates an activation signal sufficient to drive division and differentiation without T cell activation.

B1 cells self-renew and spontaneously secrete IgM and IgG3 serum antibodies. B-1 cells continually secrete natural IgM antibodies without the presence of antigen or infection. This distinguishes them from conventional B-2 cells, which require CD4^{+} T cell dependent activation to initiate antibody production. These natural serum antibodies display extensive polyreactivity, demonstrable self-reactivity and bind to many common pathogen-associated carbohydrates. Natural serum antibodies play an important early role in the immune response to many bacteria and viruses but require complement fixation for effective antigen clearance. The antibodies produced by B-1 cells have low affinity and broad specificity, which allow some level of promiscuous/ binding across structurally related epitopes, allowing for a broad and immediate defence against potential pathogens as well as apoptotic cellular debris to contribute to immune homeostasis.

In human leprosy skin lesions, a histopathology study reported that B-1–like cells and marginal zone B cells are enriched in tuberculoid and type 1 reaction lesions compared with lepromatous, type 2 reaction, and indeterminate forms, consistent with a Th1-skewed response.

B-1 cells contribute to immune tolerance by limiting the production of IgG autoantibodies against a range of self-antigens. In murine models of lupus, such as the Lyn-/- mouse, B-1 cells suppress IgG autoimmune responses for proteins including C1q, collagen, laminin, IFNγ, TNFα, MPO, and PR3. They also secrete IL-10, an anti-inflammatory cytokine that inhibits both CD8^{+} T cell activation and immunoglobulin antibody class switching of autoimmune B cells.

B1b cells are known to be able to induce some type of memory, but their role in memory cells is unknown and may follow an untraditional route.

B1b cells have effective and long-lasting responses to Borrelia hermsii, Streptococcus pneumoniae, Salmonella enterica, Salmonella typhi and Enterobacter cloacae bacteria.

== Laboratory isolation ==
In research laboratories, B1 cells can be easily isolated from a mouse by injecting cell medium or PBS into the peritoneal cavity of the mouse and then draining it off via a technique mirroring diagnostic peritoneal lavage. Cells can be identified and placed into two categories "B1a" or B1b" using flow cytometry looking for surface expression of CD19, B220, and CD5. B1a expresses high CD5 level, while B1b expresses low CD5 to almost-absent levels; both are CD19^{+} and B220^{low/-}.
