= CD23 =

Low-affinity" receptor for IgE

FCER2
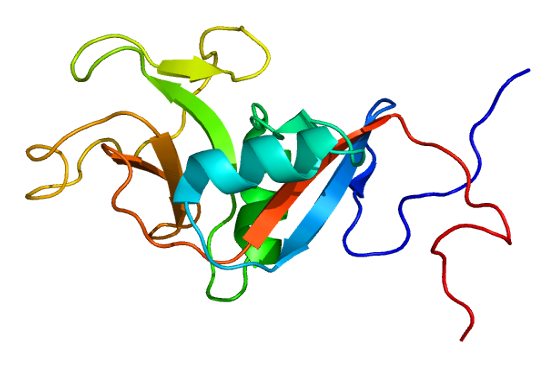

Identifiers
- Aliases: FCER2, BLAST-2, CD23, CD23A, CLEC4J, FCE2, IGEBF, Fc fragment of IgE receptor II, FCErII, Fc epsilon receptor II
- External IDs: OMIM: 151445; MGI: 95497; GeneCards: FCER2
Available structures
PDB	Ortholog search: PDBe RCSB
PDB	List of PDB id codes 4KI1, 1T8C, 1T8D, 2H2R, 2H2T, 4EZM, 4G96, 4G9A, 4GI0, 4GJ0, 4GJX, 4GK1, 4GKO, 4J6J, 4J6K, 4J6L, 4J6M, 4J6N, 4J6P, 4J6Q

Gene location (Human)
Chr.	Chromosome 19 (human)
Band	19p13.2	Start	7,688,758 bp
Band	19p13.2	End	7,702,146 bp

Gene location (Mouse)
Chr.	Chromosome 8 (mouse)
Band	8 A1.1|8 1.92 cM	Start	3,731,737 bp
Band	8 A1.1|8 1.92 cM	End	3,744,175 bp
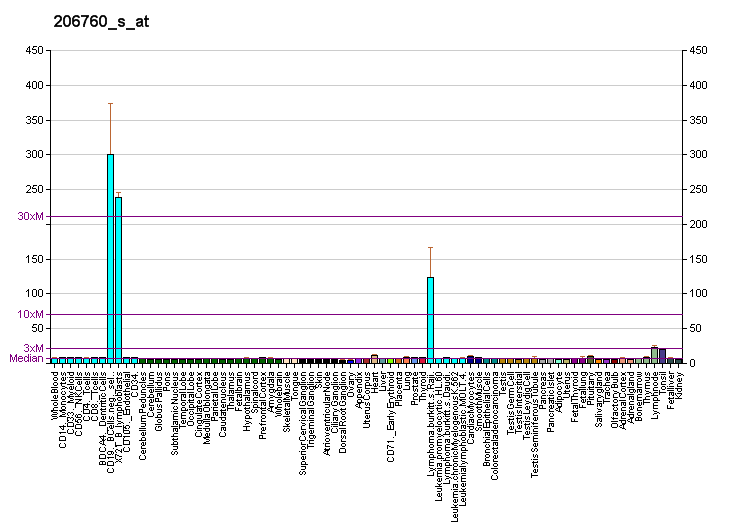

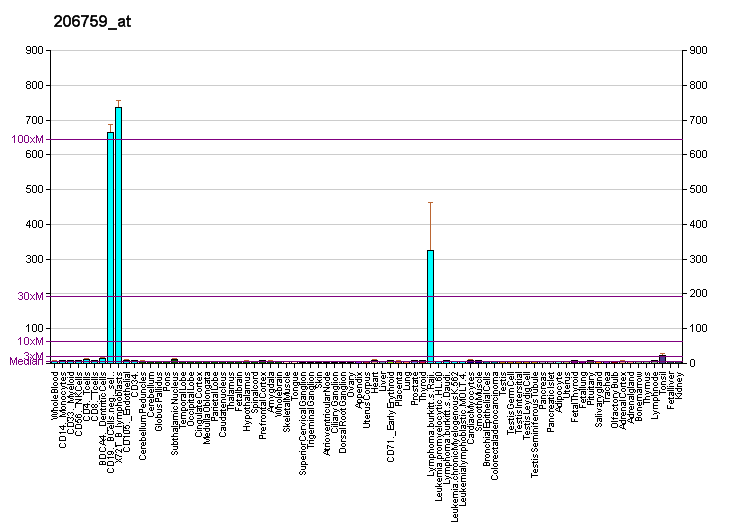
RNA expression pattern
Bgee	Human / Mouse (ortholog); Top expressed in: testicle; granulocyte; spleen; lymph node; appendix; blood; monocyte; mucosa of transverse colon; bone marrow cell; tonsil / Top expressed in: mesenteric lymph nodes; spleen; blood; subcutaneous adipose tissue; granulocyte; embryo; thymus; tibiofemoral joint; white adipose tissue; morula; More reference expression data
BioGPS	More reference expression data
Gene ontology
Molecular function	IgE binding; integrin binding; protein binding; metal ion binding; carbohydrate binding
Cellular component	integral component of membrane; extracellular region; plasma membrane; integral component of plasma membrane; extracellular exosome; external side of plasma membrane; membrane
Biological process	Notch signaling pathway; positive regulation of humoral immune response mediated by circulating immunoglobulin; positive regulation of nitric-oxide synthase activity; positive regulation of killing of cells of other organism; positive regulation of nitric-oxide synthase biosynthetic process; cytokine-mediated signaling pathway
Sources:Amigo / QuickGO
Orthologs
Databases	NCBI: entry; OMA: entry
Species	Human	Mouse
Entrez	2208	14128
Ensembl	ENSG00000104921	ENSMUSG00000005540
UniProt	P06734	P20693
RefSeq (mRNA)	NM_001207019; NM_001220500; NM_002002	NM_001253737; NM_001253739; NM_001253743; NM_001253745; NM_001253746 NM_001253747; NM_013517
RefSeq (protein)	NP_001193948; NP_001207429; NP_001993	NP_001240666; NP_001240668; NP_001240672; NP_001240674; NP_001240675 NP_001240676; NP_038545
Location (UCSC)	Chr 19: 7.69 – 7.7 Mb	Chr 8: 3.73 – 3.74 Mb
PubMed search
- Wikidata
View/Edit Human	View/Edit Mouse

CD23, also known as Fc epsilon RII, or FcεRII, is the "low-affinity" receptor for IgE, an antibody isotype involved in allergy and resistance to parasites, and is important in regulation of IgE levels. Unlike many of the antibody receptors, CD23 is a C-type lectin. It is found on mature B cells, activated macrophages, eosinophils, follicular dendritic cells, and platelets.

There are two forms of CD23: CD23a and CD23b. CD23a is present on follicular B cells, whereas CD23b requires IL-4 to be expressed on T-cells, monocytes, Langerhans cells, eosinophils, and macrophages.

== Function ==
CD23 is known to have a role of transportation in antibody feedback regulation. Antigens which enter the blood stream can be captured by antigen specific IgE antibodies. The IgE immune complexes that are formed bind to CD23 molecules on B cells, and are transported to the B cell follicles of the spleen. The antigen is then transferred from CD23+ B cells to CD11c+ antigen presenting cells. The CD11c+ cells in turn present the antigen to CD4+ T cells, which can lead to an enhanced antibody response.

== Clinical significance ==
The allergen responsible in dust mite allergy—Der p 1—is known to cleave CD23 from a cell's surface. As CD23 is soluble, it can move freely and interact with cells in plasma. Recent studies have shown that increased levels of soluble CD23 cause the recruitment of non-sensitised B-cells in the presentation of antigen peptides to allergen-specific B-cells, therefore increasing the production of allergen specific IgE. IgE, in turn, is known to upregulate the cellular expression of CD23 and Fc epsilon RI (high-affinity IgE receptor).

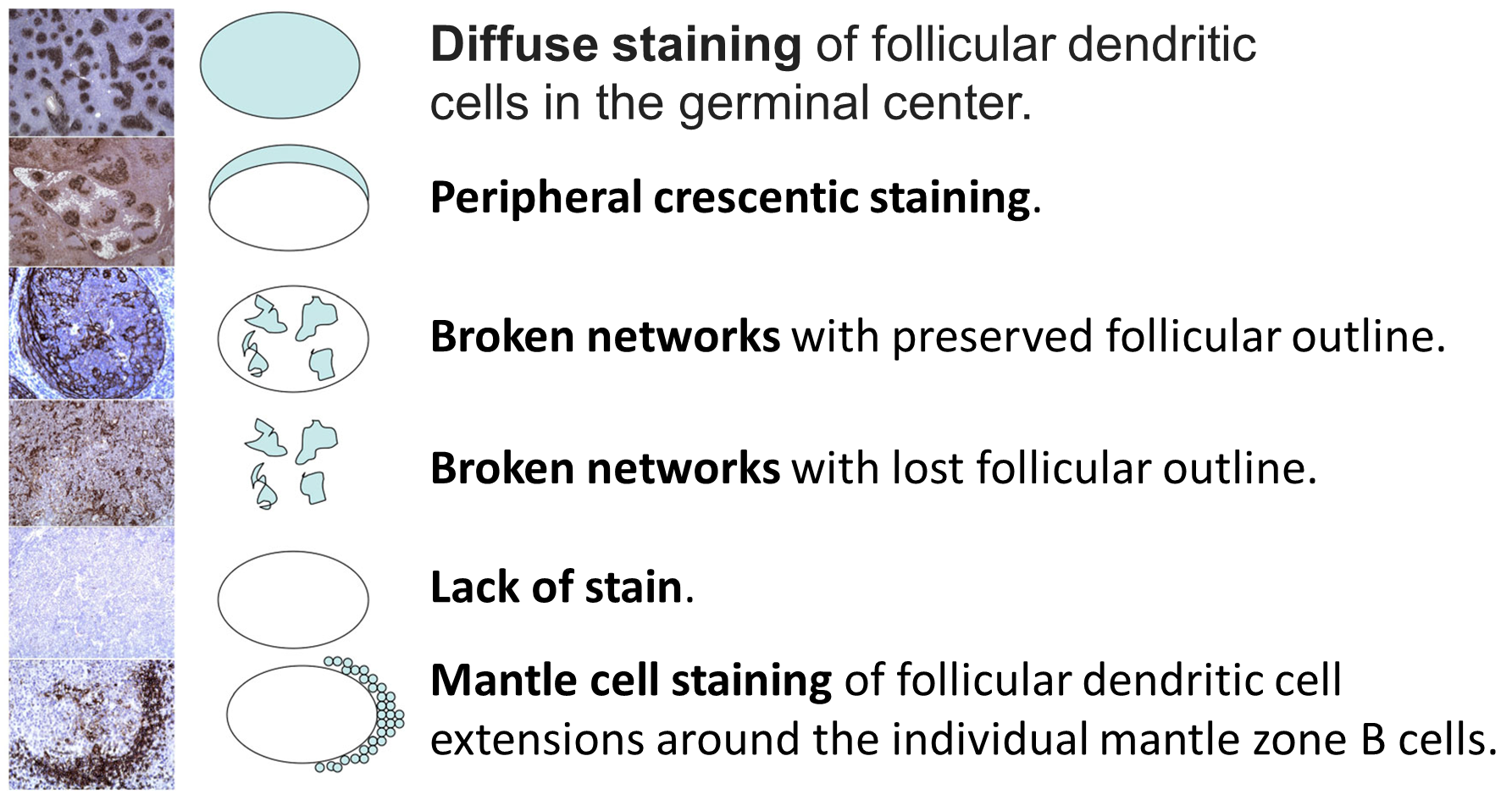
Patterns of CD23 (and CD21) expression by the follicular dendritic cells in follicular lymphoma.

In flow cytometry, CD23 is helpful in the differentiation of chronic lymphocytic leukemia (CD23-positive) from mantle cell lymphoma (CD23-negative). CD23 can also be demonstrated in germinal centre follicular dendritic cells using immunohistochemistry but is minimally expressed by benign germinal center B cells. In contrast to neoplastic mantle cells (which are negative for CD23), the resting cells of physiologic mantle zone express CD23. Paradoxically, Lymphomas arising from the mantle zone are generally negative for CD23, while most B-cell chronic lymphomocytic leukaemias are positive, allowing immunohistochemistry to distinguish these conditions, which otherwise have a similar appearance. Reed–Sternberg cells are usually positive for CD23.

== See also ==
- Cluster of differentiation, a list of all the CD-numbered proteins
