= Scavenger receptor cysteine-rich protein domain =

SRCR
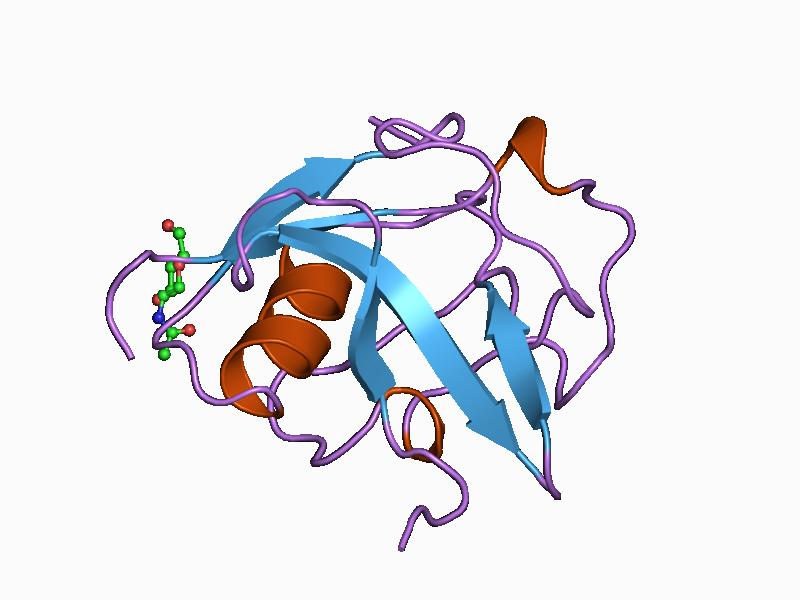
- structure of m2bp scavenger receptor cysteine-rich domain

Identifiers
- Symbol: SRCR
- Pfam: PF00530
- InterPro: IPR001190
- PROSITE: PDOC00348
- SCOP2: 1by2 / SCOPe / SUPFAM
Available protein structures:
- PDB: IPR001190 PF00530 (ECOD; PDBsum)
- AlphaFold: IPR001190; PF00530

In molecular biology, the protein domain SRCR is short for Scavenger receptor cysteine-rich domain. They are found solely in eukaryotes. These domains are present on the cell membrane and have a role in binding to specific ligands and are often found to be involved with the immune system.

== Function ==
The function of these endocytic receptors are to mediating non-opsonic phagocytosis in response to foreign ligands. This triggers various processes of host defence and immune response.

== Structure ==
The structure contains a six stranded beta-sheet and one alpha-helix.

== Examples ==
The speract receptor found in egg, is a transmembrane glycoprotein. Other members of this family include the macrophage scavenger receptor type I, an enteropeptidase, and T-cell surface glycoprotein CD5.
