= Immunoglobulin D =

Antibody isotype

Some antibodies form polymers that bind to multiple antigen molecules.

Immunoglobulin D (IgD) is an antibody isotype that makes up about 1% of proteins in the plasma membranes of immature B-lymphocytes where it is usually co-expressed with another cell surface antibody called IgM. IgD is also produced in a secreted form that is found in very small amounts in blood serum, representing 0.25% of immunoglobulins in serum. The relative molecular mass and half-life of secreted IgD is 185 kDa and 2.8 days, respectively. Secreted IgD is produced as a monomeric antibody with two heavy chains of the delta (δ) class, and two Ig light chains.

== Function ==
The function of IgD has been a puzzle in immunology since its discovery in 1964. IgD is present in species from cartilaginous fish to humans (with the possible exception of birds). This nearly ubiquitous appearance in species with an adaptive immune system demonstrates that IgD may be as ancient as IgM and suggests that IgD has important immunological functions.

In B cells, the function of IgD is to signal the B cells to be activated. By being activated, B cells are ready to take part in the defense of the body as part of the immune system. During B cell differentiation, IgM is the exclusive isotype expressed by immature B cells. IgD starts to be expressed when the B cell exits the bone marrow to populate peripheral lymphoid tissues. When a B cell reaches its mature state, it co-expresses both IgM and IgD. A 2016 study by Übelhart and colleagues found that IgD signaling is only triggered by repetitive multivalent immunogens, while IgM can be triggered either by soluble monomeric or by multivalent immunogens. Cδ knockout mice (mice that have been genetically altered so that they do not produce IgD) have no major B cell intrinsic defects. IgD may have some role in allergic reactions.

IgD was found to bind to basophils and mast cells and activate these cells to produce antimicrobial factors to participate in respiratory immune defense in humans. It also stimulates basophils to release B cell homeostatic factors. This is consistent with the reduction in the number of peripheral B cells, reduced serum IgE level and defective primary IgG1 response in IgD knockout mice.

IgD was found to be required for efficient selection against self-reacting B cells in mouse germinal centers.

== Expression ==
B cells may express IgD by alternative RNA splicing and class switch recombination. Alternative splicing is promoted in all jawed vertebrates but class switch recombination occurs only in higher vertebrates (including humans) and increases diversification of IgD.

=== Human coexpression ===
In the human heavy chain locus, 3' of the V-D-J cassette is a series of C (for constant) genes, each conferring an Ig isotype. The Cμ (IgM) gene is 3' and closest to the V-D-J cassette, with the Cδ gene appearing 3' to Cμ.

A primary mRNA transcript will contain the transcribed V-D-J cassette, and the Cμ and Cδ genes, with introns in between them.

Alternative splicing can then occur, causing a selection of either Cμ or Cδ to appear on the functional mRNA (μ mRNA and δ mRNA respectively). Alternative splicing is thought to be possible due to two polyadenylation sites, one appearing between the Cμ and Cδ, and the other 3' of Cδ (polyadenylation in the latter site would cause Cμ to be spliced away along with the intron). The precise mechanism of how the polyadenylation site is chosen remains unclear.

The resulting functional mRNA will have the V-D-J and C regions contiguous, and its translation will generate either a μ heavy chain or δ heavy chain. The heavy chains then couple with either κ or λ light chains to create the final IgM or IgD antibody.

Zinc finger protein 318 (ZNF318) has a role in the promotion of IgD expression and controlling the alternative splicing of the long pre-mRNA. In immature B cells that mainly express the μ transcript, there is no ZFP318 expression, but in mature B cells with dual IgM and IgD expression, both δ and μ transcript is made and ZFP318 is expressed. Enders et al. (2014) found in mice that null mutations in ZFP318 resulted in no IgD expression.

== Activation of immune system via IgD ==
Innate and adaptive Immune responses can be activated via membrane-anchored IgD that functions as a part of B-cell receptor (BCR) complexes or secreted IgD that binds to monocytes, mast cells, and basophils. Counter-intuitive to the contemporary dogmas that suggest these activated immune responses via IgD expression can potentiate autoimmune diseases and allergic inflammation, a 2010 study by Nguyen TG et al. has first demonstrated that treatments with a B-cell activating monoclonal anti-IgD antibody can attenuate disease severity in an animal model of collagen-induced arthritis. This novel therapeutic effect by anti-IgD antibody treatment was later confirmed in mouse models of epidermolysis bullosa acquisita and in chronic contact hypersensitivity. Studies have shown that levels of secreted lgD are usually elevated in patients with an autoimmune disease, and recently it has been demonstrated that IgD enhanced the activation of peripheral blood mononuclear cells in Rheumatoid Arthritis (RA) patients leading to the hypothesis that IgD could be an immunotherapeutic target for the management of RA. Activated immune responses via IgD-BCR and secreted IgD may exert suppressive effects on autoimmune diseases and allergic inflammations, suggesting a potential immune regulatory function of IgD. Genetic studies of IgD-deficiency in lupus, lung inflammation and Type-1 diabetes mouse models showed the absence of IgD expression exacerbates and accelerates inflammation of these conditions, suggesting a protective and regulatory role of IgD-mediated immune responses in dampening these autoimmune conditions.

== Structural diversity ==
Being a primodial immunoglobulin heavy (H) chain along with IgG, IgD (also known as IgW in fish) is found in almost all lineages of the jawed vertebrates (including humans; "jawed fish") and has undergone many changes in these countless branches of the tree of life. The IgD heavy chain (Cδ) consists of several exons. A variable number of them contain immunoglobulin-fold Cδ domains (usually one each) and there may also be some transmembrane-domain (TM) exons for a membrane-bound/BCR form of the IgD. The numeric variation reflects a history of exon duplication followed by diversification. Depending on whether alternative splicing includes the TM exons, the IgD may end up either as an anchored B-cell receptor or a free-floating antibody.

In humans and other primates, IgD consists of five non-transmembrane exons. The 1st, 4th, and 5th each code for a Cδ domain. The middle two code for a flexible hinge. The hinge's N-terminal region is rich in alanine and threonine residues. C-terminal regions are rich in lysine, glutamate and arginine residues modified with O-glycosylation for binding a putative IgD receptor on the surface of activated T cells. The hinge interacts with heparin and heparan sulphate proteglycans expressed in the basophils and mast cells. Mice have a shorter IgD, without the final Cδ exon; the hinge is also single-exon.

Not all animals encode just one IGHD gene/exon-group like humans (and the presumed primodial ancestor) do. For example, the channel catfish Ictalurus punctatus have two copies of its entire IGH regions, which have diverged in function. The IgD on one gene has no TM exons while the other does, so that whether TM exons are included becomes a matter of gene-choice instead of exon-choice. The cartilaginous fishes have massive duplications of these kinds of regions.

Across vertebrate lineages IgD has been much more structurally variable than IgM. This may reflect its role as a more flexible backup to IgM. It could also allow some species to survive in case of IgM defects.
