= B cell =

Type of white blood cell

B lymphocyte cell
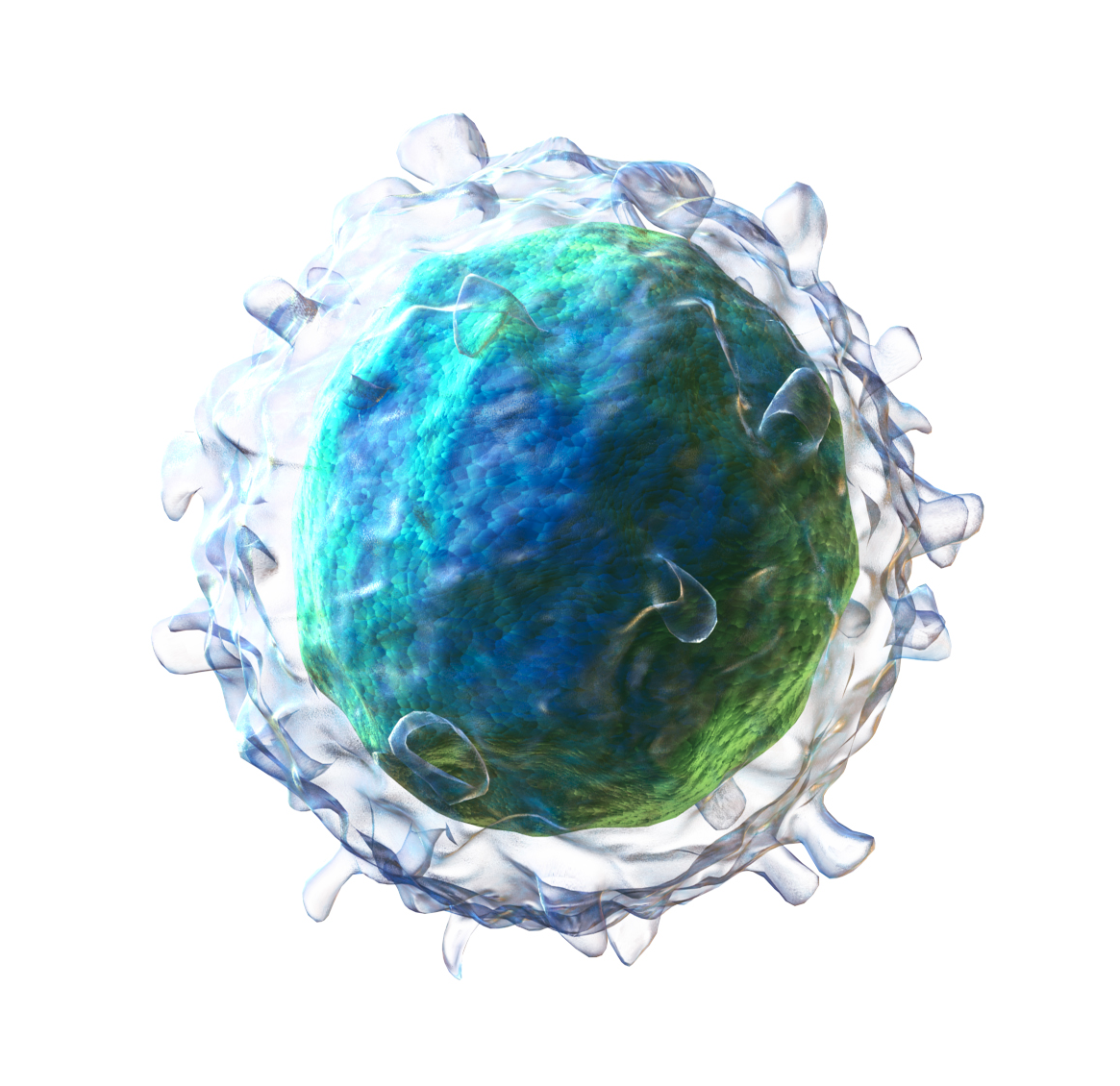
- Animation of B cell

Details
- Precursor: Hematopoietic stem cell
- System: Immune system

Identifiers
- Latin: lymphocytus B
- MeSH: D001402
- FMA: 62869

B cells, also known as B lymphocytes, are a type of lymphocyte. They function in the humoral immunity component of the adaptive immune system. B cells produce antibody molecules which may be either secreted or inserted into the plasma membrane where they serve as a part of B-cell receptors. When a naïve or memory B cell is activated by an antigen, it proliferates and differentiates into an antibody-secreting effector cell, known as a plasmablast or plasma cell. In addition, B cells present antigens (they are also classified as professional antigen-presenting cells, APCs) and secrete cytokines. In mammals, B cells mature in the bone marrow, which is at the core of most bones. In birds, B cells mature in the bursa of Fabricius, a lymphoid organ where they were first discovered by Timothy Chang and Bruce Glick, which is why the B stands for bursa and not bone marrow, as commonly believed.

B cells, unlike the other two classes of lymphocytes, T cells and natural killer cells, express B cell receptors (BCRs) on their cell membrane. BCRs allow the B cell to bind to a foreign antigen, against which it will initiate an antibody response. B cell receptors are extremely specific, with all BCRs on a B cell recognizing the same epitope.

== Development ==
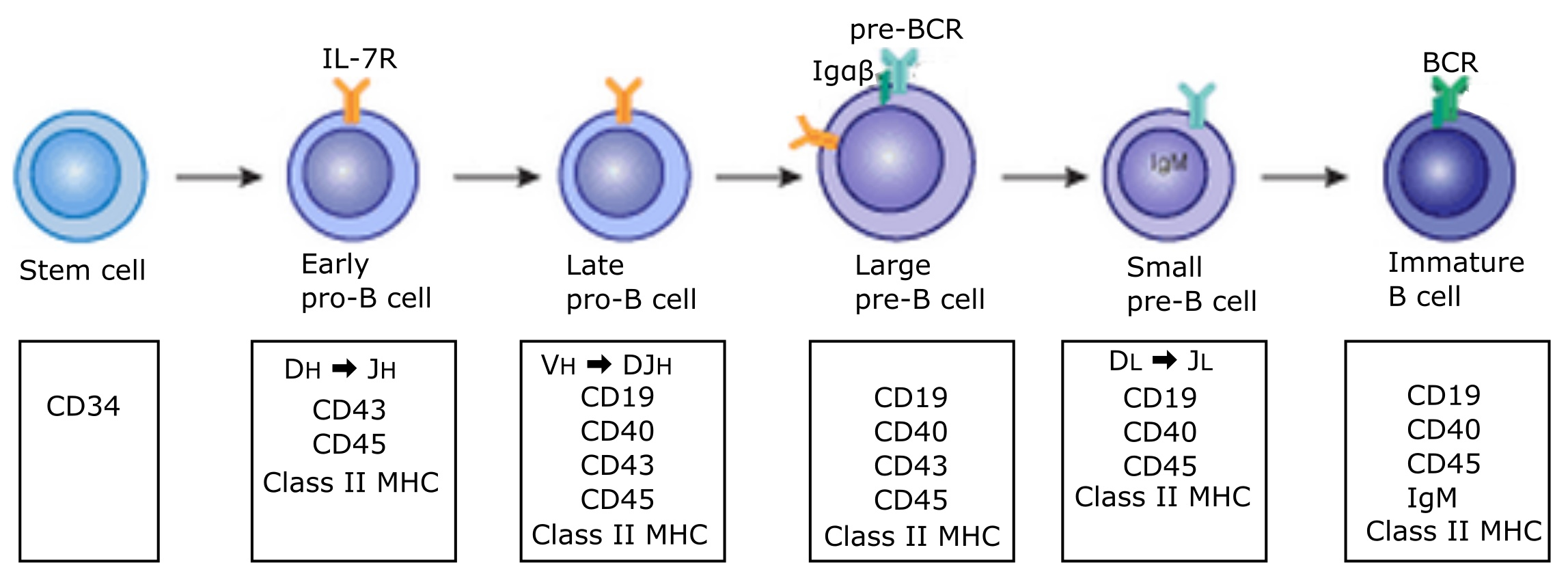
Early B cell development: from stem cell to immature B cell

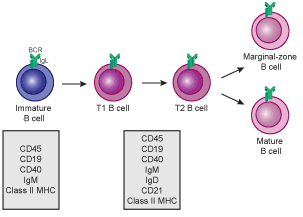
Transitional B cell development: from immature B cell to MZ B cell or mature (FO) B cell

B cells develop from hematopoietic stem cells (HSCs) that originate from bone marrow. HSCs first differentiate into multipotent progenitor (MPP) cells, then common lymphoid progenitor (CLP) cells. From here, their development into B cells occurs in several stages (shown in image to the right), each marked by various gene expression patterns and immunoglobulin H chain and L chain gene loci arrangements, the latter due to B cells undergoing V(D)J recombination as they develop.

B cells undergo two types of selection while developing in the bone marrow to ensure proper development, both involving B cell receptors (BCR) on the surface of the cell. Positive selection occurs through antigen-independent signalling involving both the pre-BCR and the BCR. If these receptors do not bind to their ligand, B cells do not receive the proper signals and cease to develop. Negative selection occurs through the binding of self-antigen with the BCR; if the BCR can bind strongly to self-antigen, then the B cell undergoes one of four fates: clonal deletion, receptor editing, anergy, or ignorance (B cell ignores signal and continues development). This negative selection process leads to a state of central tolerance, in which the mature B cells do not bind self antigens present in the bone marrow.

To complete development, immature B cells migrate from the bone marrow into the spleen as transitional B cells, passing through two transitional stages: T1 and T2. Throughout their migration to the spleen and after spleen entry, they are considered T1 B cells. Within the spleen, T1 B cells transition to T2 B cells. T2 B cells differentiate into either follicular (FO) B cells or marginal zone (MZ) B cells depending on signals received through the BCR and other receptors. Once differentiated, they are now considered mature B cells, or naïve B cells.

== Activation ==
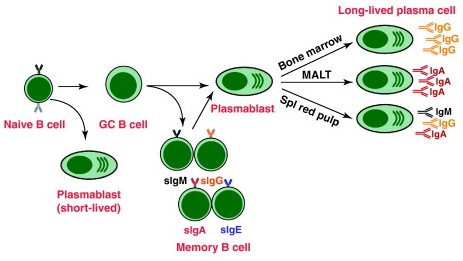
B cell activation: from immature B cell to plasma cell or memory B cell

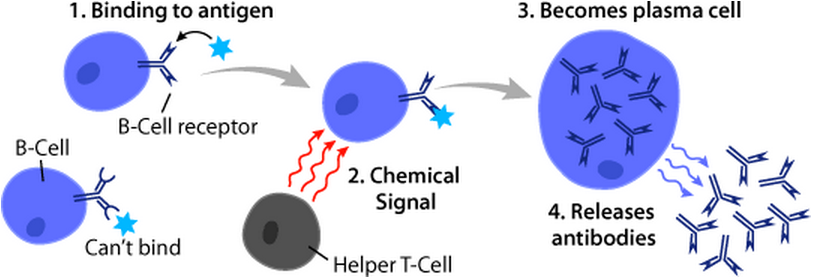
Basic B cell function: bind to an antigen, receive help from a cognate helper T cell, and differentiate into a plasma cell that secretes large numbers of antibodies

B cell activation occurs in the secondary lymphoid organs (SLOs), such as the spleen and lymph nodes. After B cells mature in the bone marrow, they migrate through the blood to SLOs, which receive a constant supply of antigen through circulating lymph. At the SLO, B cell activation begins when the B cell binds to an antigen via its BCR. Although the events taking place immediately after activation have yet to be completely determined, it is believed that B cells are activated in accordance with the kinetic segregation model , initially determined in T lymphocytes. This model denotes that before antigen stimulation, receptors diffuse through the membrane coming into contact with Lck and CD45 in equal frequency, rendering a net equilibrium of phosphorylation and non-phosphorylation. It is only when the cell comes in contact with an antigen presenting cell that the larger CD45 is displaced due to the close distance between the two membranes. This allows for net phosphorylation of the BCR and the initiation of the signal transduction pathway. Of the three B cell subsets, FO B cells preferentially undergo T cell-dependent activation while MZ B cells and B1 B cells preferentially undergo T cell-independent activation.

B cell activation is enhanced through the activity of CD21, a surface receptor in complex with surface proteins CD19 and CD81 (all three are collectively known as the B cell coreceptor complex). When a BCR binds an antigen tagged with a fragment of the C3 complement protein, CD21 binds the C3 fragment, co-ligates with the bound BCR, and signals are transduced through CD19 and CD81 to lower the activation threshold of the cell.

=== T cell-dependent activation ===
Antigens that activate B cells with the help of T-cell are known as T cell-dependent (TD) antigens and include foreign proteins. They are named as such because they are unable to induce a humoral response in organisms that lack T cells. B cell responses to these antigens takes multiple days, though antibodies generated have a higher affinity and are more functionally versatile than those generated from T cell-independent activation.

Once a BCR binds a TD antigen, the antigen is taken up into the B cell through receptor-mediated endocytosis, degraded, and presented to T cells as peptide pieces in complex with MHC-II molecules on the cell membrane. T helper (T_{H}) cells, typically follicular T helper (T_{FH}) cells recognize and bind these MHC-II-peptide complexes through their T cell receptor (TCR). Following TCR-MHC-II-peptide binding, T cells express the surface protein CD40L as well as cytokines such as IL-4 and IL-21. CD40L serves as a necessary co-stimulatory factor for B cell activation by binding the B cell surface receptor CD40, which promotes B cell proliferation, immunoglobulin class switching, and somatic hypermutation as well as sustains T cell growth and differentiation. T cell-derived cytokines bound by B cell cytokine receptors also promote B cell proliferation, immunoglobulin class switching, and somatic hypermutation as well as guide differentiation. After B cells receive these signals, they are considered activated.

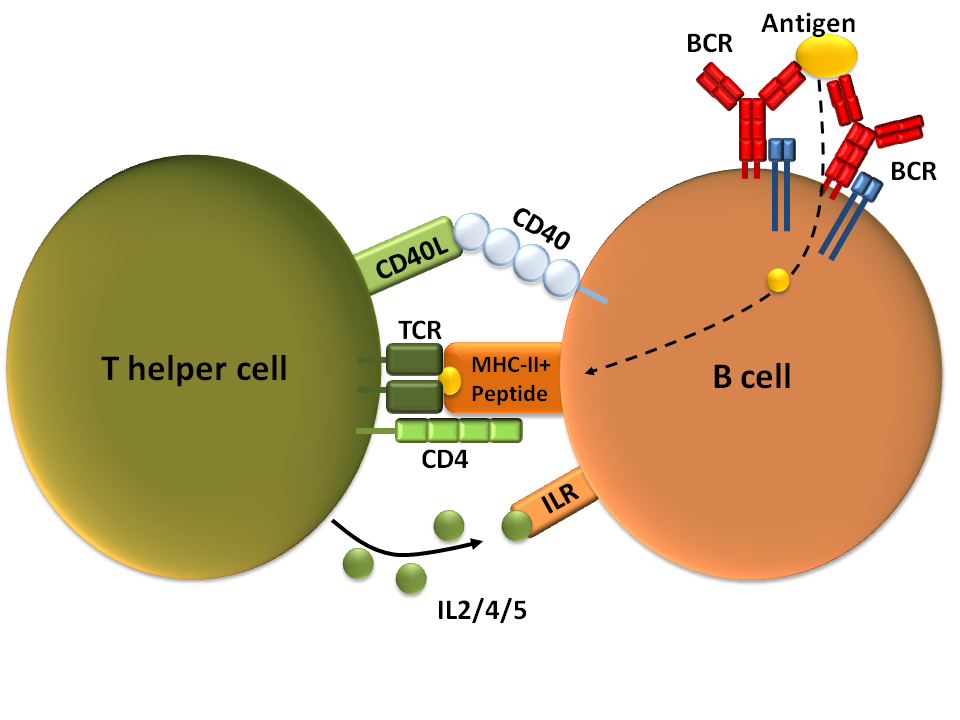
T-dependent B cell activation

Once activated, B cells participate in a two-step differentiation process that yields both short-lived plasmablasts for immediate protection and long-lived plasma cells and memory B cells for persistent protection. The first step, known as the extrafollicular response, occurs outside lymphoid follicles but still in the SLO. During this step activated B cells proliferate, may undergo immunoglobulin class switching, and differentiate into plasmablasts that produce early, weak antibodies mostly of class IgM.

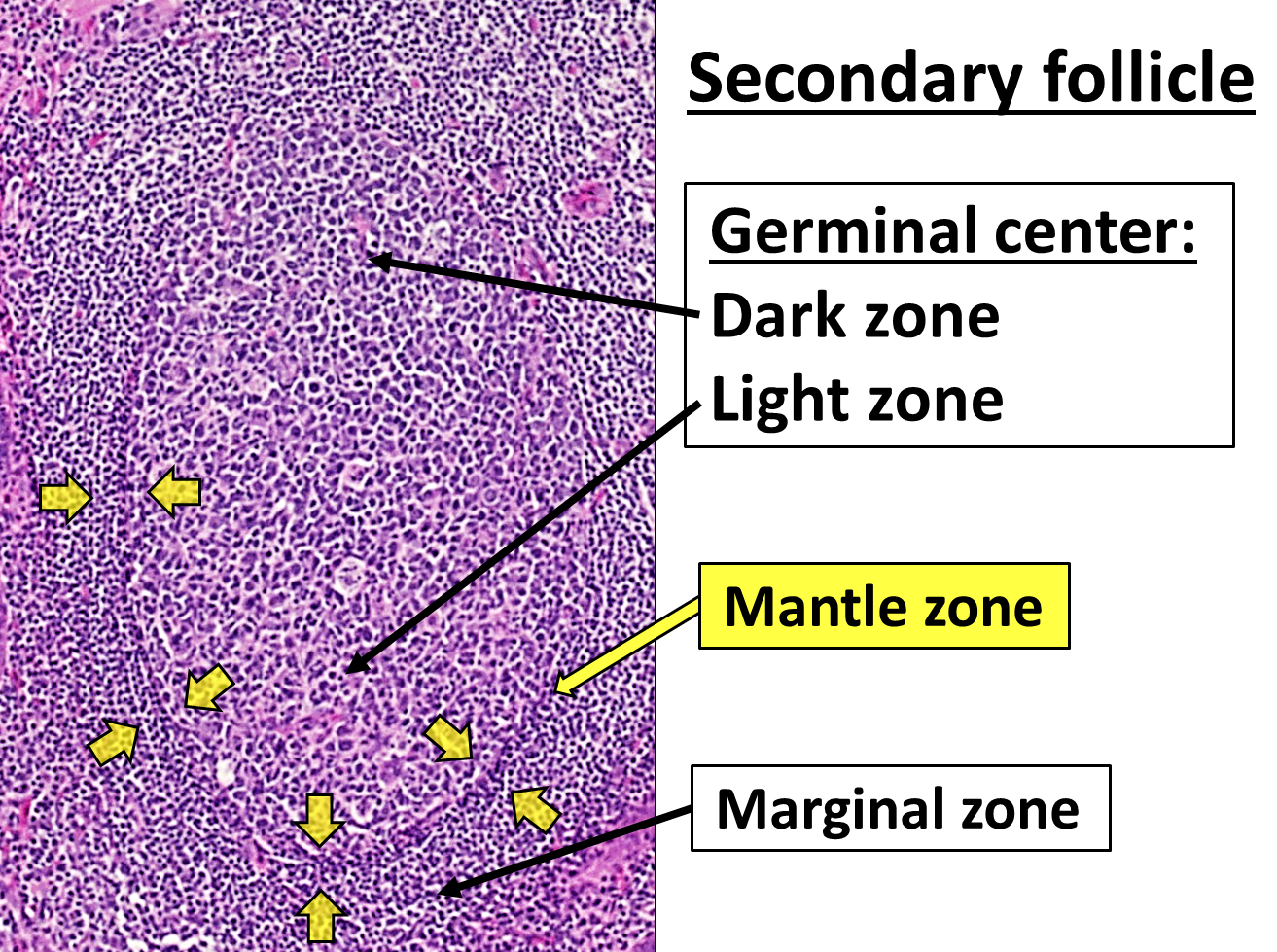
Histology of a normal lymphoid follicle, with germinal center in the middle.

The second step consists of activated B cells entering a lymphoid follicle and forming a germinal center (GC), which is a specialized microenvironment where B cells undergo extensive proliferation, immunoglobulin class switching, and affinity maturation directed by somatic hypermutation. These processes are facilitated by T_{FH} and follicular dendritic cells within the GC and generate both high-affinity memory B cells and long-lived plasma cells. Resultant plasma cells secrete large numbers of antibodies and either stay within the SLO or, more preferentially, migrate to bone marrow.

=== T cell-independent activation ===
Antigens that activate B cells without T cell help are known as T cell-independent (TI) antigens and include foreign polysaccharides and unmethylated CpG DNA. They are named as such because they are able to induce a humoral response in organisms that lack T cells. B cell response to these antigens is rapid, though antibodies generated tend to have lower affinity and are less functionally versatile than those generated from T cell-dependent activation.

As with TD antigens, B cells activated by TI antigens need additional signals to complete activation, but instead of receiving them from T cells, they are provided either by recognition and binding of a common microbial constituent to toll-like receptors (TLRs) or by extensive crosslinking of BCRs to repeated epitopes on a bacterial cell. B cells activated by TI antigens go on to proliferate outside lymphoid follicles but still in SLOs (GCs do not form), possibly undergo immunoglobulin class switching, and differentiate into short-lived plasmablasts that produce early, weak antibodies mostly of class IgM, but also some populations of long-lived plasma cells.

=== Memory B cell activation ===
Memory B cell activation begins with the detection and binding of their target antigen, which is shared by their parent B cell. Some memory B cells can be activated without T cell help, such as certain virus-specific memory B cells, but others need T cell help. Upon antigen binding, the memory B cell takes up the antigen through receptor-mediated endocytosis, degrades it, and presents it to T cells as peptide pieces in complex with MHC-II molecules on the cell membrane. Memory T helper (T_{H}) cells, typically memory follicular T helper (T_{FH}) cells, that were derived from T cells activated with the same antigen recognize and bind these MHC-II-peptide complexes through their TCR. Following TCR-MHC-II-peptide binding and the relay of other signals from the memory T_{FH} cell, the memory B cell is activated and differentiates either into plasmablasts and plasma cells via an extrafollicular response or enter a germinal center reaction where they generate plasma cells and more memory B cells. It is unclear whether the memory B cells undergo further affinity maturation within these secondary GCs. In vitro activation of memory B cells can be achieved through stimulation with various activators, such as pokeweed mitogen or anti-CD40 monoclonal antibodies, however, a study found a combination of R-848 and recombinant human IL-2 to be the most efficient activator.

== B cell types ==
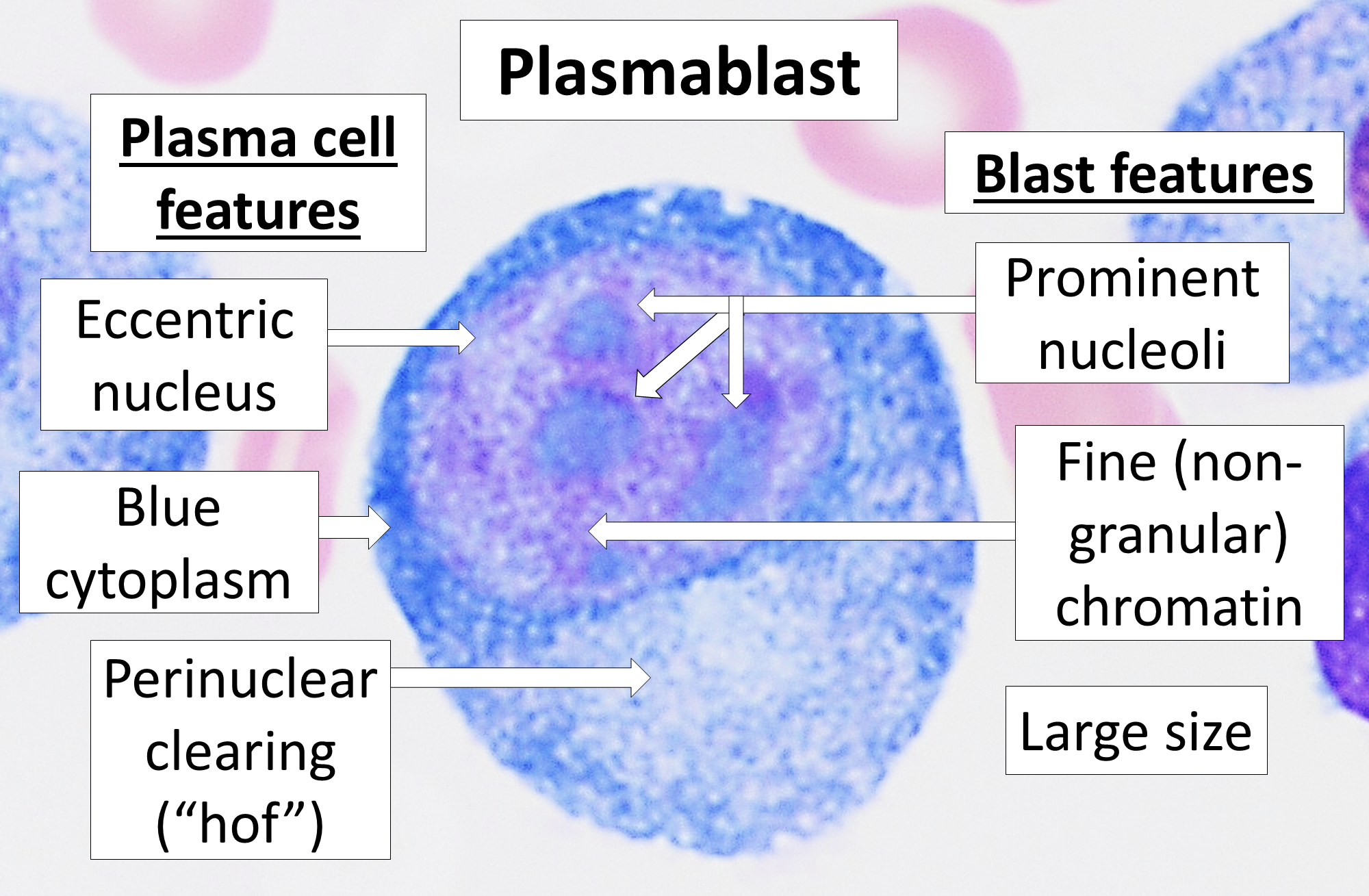
Plasmablast, Wright stain.

Plasmablast
A short-lived, proliferating antibody-secreting cell arising from B cell differentiation. Plasmablasts are generated early in an infection and their antibodies tend to have a weaker affinity towards their target antigen compared to plasma cell. Plasmablasts can result from T cell-independent activation of B cells or the extrafollicular response from T cell-dependent activation of B cells.
Plasma cell
A long-lived, non-proliferating antibody-secreting cell arising from B cell differentiation. There is evidence that B cells first differentiate into a plasmablast-like cell, then differentiate into a plasma cell. Plasma cells are generated later in an infection and, compared to plasmablasts, have antibodies with a higher affinity towards their target antigen due to affinity maturation in the germinal center (GC) and produce more antibodies. Plasma cells typically result from the germinal center reaction from T cell-dependent activation of B cells, though they can also result from T cell-independent activation of B cells.
Lymphoplasmacytoid cell
A cell with a mixture of B lymphocyte and plasma cell morphological features that is thought to be closely related to or a subtype of plasma cells. This cell type is found in pre-malignant and malignant plasma cell dyscrasias that are associated with the secretion of IgM monoclonal proteins; these dyscrasias include IgM monoclonal gammopathy of undetermined significance and Waldenström's macroglobulinemia.
Memory B cell
Dormant B cell arising from B cell differentiation. Their function is to circulate through the body and initiate a stronger, more rapid antibody response (known as the anamnestic secondary antibody response) if they detect the antigen that had activated their parent B cell (memory B cells and their parent B cells share the same BCR, thus they detect the same antigen). Memory B cells can be generated from T cell-dependent activation through both the extrafollicular response and the germinal center reaction as well as from T cell-independent activation of B1 cells.
B-2 cell
FO B cells and MZ B cells.

Follicular (FO) B cell (also known as a B-2 cell)
Most common type of B cell and, when not circulating through the blood, is found mainly in the lymphoid follicles of secondary lymphoid organs (SLOs). They are responsible for generating the majority of high-affinity antibodies during an infection.
Marginal-zone (MZ) B cell
Found mainly in the marginal zone of the spleen and serves as a first line of defense against blood-borne pathogens, as the marginal zone receives large amounts of blood from the general circulation. They can undergo both T cell-independent and T cell-dependent activation, but preferentially undergo T cell-independent activation.

B-1 cell
Arises from a developmental pathway different from FO B cells and MZ B cells. In mice, they predominantly populate the peritoneal cavity and pleural cavity, generate natural antibodies (antibodies produced without infection), defend against mucosal pathogens, and primarily exhibit T cell-independent activation. A true homologue of mouse B-1 cells has not been discovered in humans, though various cell populations similar to B-1 cells have been described.
Regulatory B (Breg) cell
An immunosuppressive B cell type that stops the expansion of pathogenic, pro-inflammatory lymphocytes through the secretion of IL-10, IL-35, and TGF-β. Also, it promotes the generation of regulatory T (Treg) cells by directly interacting with T cells to skew their differentiation towards Tregs. No common Breg cell identity has been described and many Breg cell subsets sharing regulatory functions have been found in both mice and humans. It is currently unknown if Breg cell subsets are developmentally linked and how exactly differentiation into a Breg cell occurs. There is evidence showing that nearly all B cell types can differentiate into a Breg cell through mechanisms involving inflammatory signals and BCR recognition.

== B cell-related pathology ==
Autoimmune disease can result from abnormal B cell recognition of self-antigens followed by the production of autoantibodies. Autoimmune diseases where disease activity is correlated with B cell activity include scleroderma, multiple sclerosis, systemic lupus erythematosus, type 1 diabetes, post-infectious IBS, and rheumatoid arthritis.

Malignant transformation of B cells and their precursors can cause a host of cancers, including chronic lymphocytic leukemia (CLL), acute lymphoblastic leukemia (ALL), hairy cell leukemia, follicular lymphoma, non-Hodgkin's lymphoma, Hodgkin's lymphoma, and plasma cell malignancies such as multiple myeloma, Waldenström's macroglobulinemia, and certain forms of amyloidosis.

Abnormal B cells may be relatively large and some diseases include this in their names, such as diffuse large B-cell lymphomas (DLBCLs) and intravascular large B-cell lymphoma.

Patients with B cell alymphocytosis are predisposed to infections.

== Epigenetics ==
A study that investigated the methylome of B cells along their differentiation cycle, using whole-genome bisulfite sequencing (WGBS), showed that there is a hypomethylation from the earliest stages to the most differentiated stages. The largest methylation difference is between the stages of germinal center B cells and memory B cells. Furthermore, this study showed that there is a similarity between B cell tumors and long-lived B cells in their DNA methylation signatures.

== See also ==
- A20 cells
- List of distinct cell types in the adult human body
