= Complement receptor 2 =

Protein found in humans

CR2
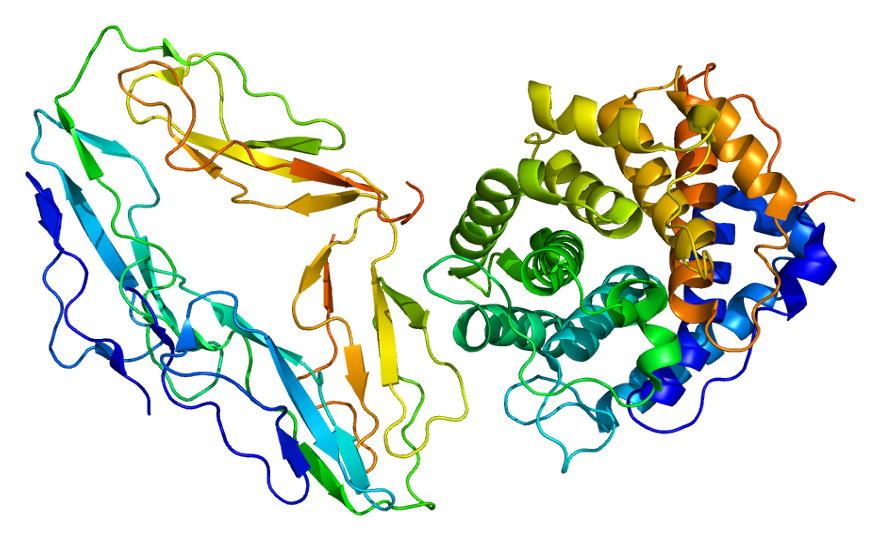

Identifiers
- Aliases: CR2, C3DR, CD21, CR, CVID7, SLEB9, complement component 3d receptor 2, complement C3d receptor 2
- External IDs: OMIM: 120650; MGI: 88489; GeneCards: CR2
Available structures
PDB	Ortholog search: PDBe RCSB
PDB	List of PDB id codes 1GHQ, 1LY2, 1W2R, 1W2S, 2GSX, 3OED

Gene location (Human)
Chr.	Chromosome 1 (human)
Band	1q32.2	Start	207,454,230 bp
Band	1q32.2	End	207,489,895 bp

Gene location (Mouse)
Chr.	Chromosome 1 (mouse)
Band	1 H6|1 98.44 cM	Start	194,819,119 bp
Band	1 H6|1 98.44 cM	End	194,859,024 bp
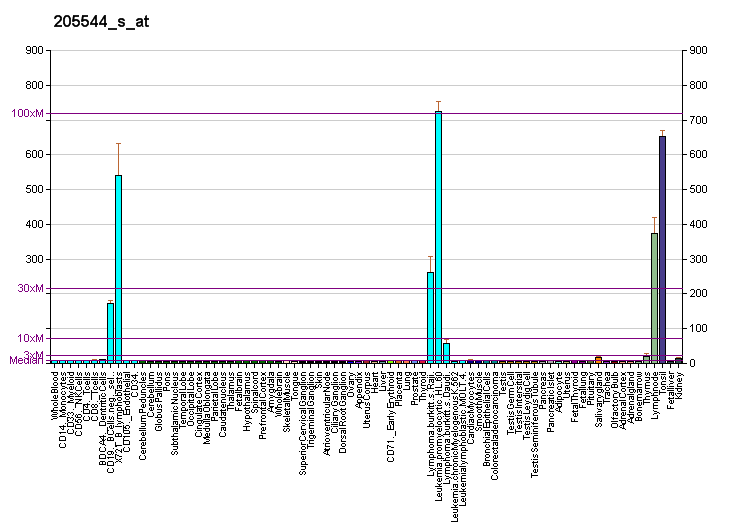
RNA expression pattern
Bgee	Human / Mouse (ortholog); Top expressed in: secondary oocyte; spleen; appendix; lymph node; mucosa of ileum; epithelium of nasopharynx; tonsil; superficial temporal artery; testicle; rectum / Top expressed in: spleen; mesenteric lymph nodes; blood; subcutaneous adipose tissue; neural layer of retina; spermatid; tunica media of zone of aorta; embryo; tunica adventitia of aorta; embryo; More reference expression data
BioGPS	More reference expression data
Gene ontology
Molecular function	DNA binding; protein homodimerization activity; virus receptor activity; complement binding; transmembrane signaling receptor activity; complement receptor activity; protein binding
Cellular component	integral component of membrane; membrane; receptor complex; extracellular exosome; plasma membrane
Biological process	immune system process; B cell proliferation; immune response; complement activation, classical pathway; viral entry into host cell; B cell differentiation; innate immune response; viral process; complement receptor mediated signaling pathway; signal transduction; regulation of complement activation
Sources:Amigo / QuickGO
Orthologs
Databases	NCBI: entry; OMA: entry
Species	Human	Mouse
Entrez	1380	12902
Ensembl	ENSG00000117322	ENSMUSG00000026616
UniProt	P20023	P19070
RefSeq (mRNA)	NM_001006658; NM_001877	NM_007758; NM_001368765
RefSeq (protein)	NP_001006659; NP_001868	n/a
Location (UCSC)	Chr 1: 207.45 – 207.49 Mb	Chr 1: 194.82 – 194.86 Mb
PubMed search
- Wikidata
View/Edit Human	View/Edit Mouse

Complement receptor type 2 (CR2), also known as complement C3d receptor, Epstein–Barr virus receptor, and CD21 (cluster of differentiation 21), is a glycoprotein that in humans is encoded by the CR2 gene.

CR2 is involved in the complement system. It binds to iC3b (inactive derivative of C3b), C3dg, or C3d. B cells express CR2 on their surfaces, allowing the complement system to play a role in B-cell activation and maturation.

== Interactions ==
Complement receptor 2 interacts with CD19, and, on mature B cells, forms a complex with CD81 (TAPA-1). The CR2-CD19-CD81 complex is often called the B cell co-receptor complex, because CR2 binds to opsonized antigens through attached C3d (or iC3b or C3dg) when the B-cell receptor binds antigen. This results in the B cell having greatly enhanced response to the antigen.

Epstein–Barr virus (EBV) can bind CR2, enabling EBV to enter and infect B cells. Yefenof et al. (1976) found complete overlapping of EBV receptors and C3 receptors on human B cells.

== Isoforms ==
The canonical Cr2/CD21 gene of subprimate mammals produces two types of complement receptor (CR1, ca. 200 kDa; CR2, ca. 145 kDa) via alternative mRNA splicing. The murine Cr2 gene contains 25 exons; a common first exon is spliced to exon 2 and to exon 9 in transcripts encoding CR1 and CR2, respectively. A transcript with an open reading frame of 4,224 nucleotides encodes the long isoform, CR1; this is predicted to be a protein of 1,408 amino acids that includes 21 short consensus repeats (SCR) of ca. 60 amino acids each, plus transmembrane and cytoplasmic regions. Isoform CR2 (1,032 amino acids) is encoded by a shorter transcript (3,096 coding nucleotides) that lacks exons 2–8 encoding SCR1-6. CR1 and CR2 on murine B cells form complexes with a co-accessory activation complex containing CD19, CD81, and the fragilis/Ifitm (murine equivalents of LEU13) proteins.

The CR2 gene of primates produces only the smaller isoform, CR2; primate complement receptor 1, which recapitulates many of the structural domains and presumed functions of Cr2-derived CR1 in subprimates, is encoded by a distinct CR1 gene (apparently derived from the gene Crry of subprimates).

Isoforms CR1 and CR2 derived from the non-primate Cr2 locus possess the same C-terminal sequence, such that association with and activation through CD19 should be equivalent. CR1 can bind to C4b and C3b complexes, whereas CR2 (murine and human) binds to C3dg-bound complexes. CR1, a surface protein produced primarily by follicular dendritic cells, appears to be critical for generation of appropriately activated B cells of the germinal centre and for mature antibody responses to bacterial infection.

== Immunohistochemistry ==
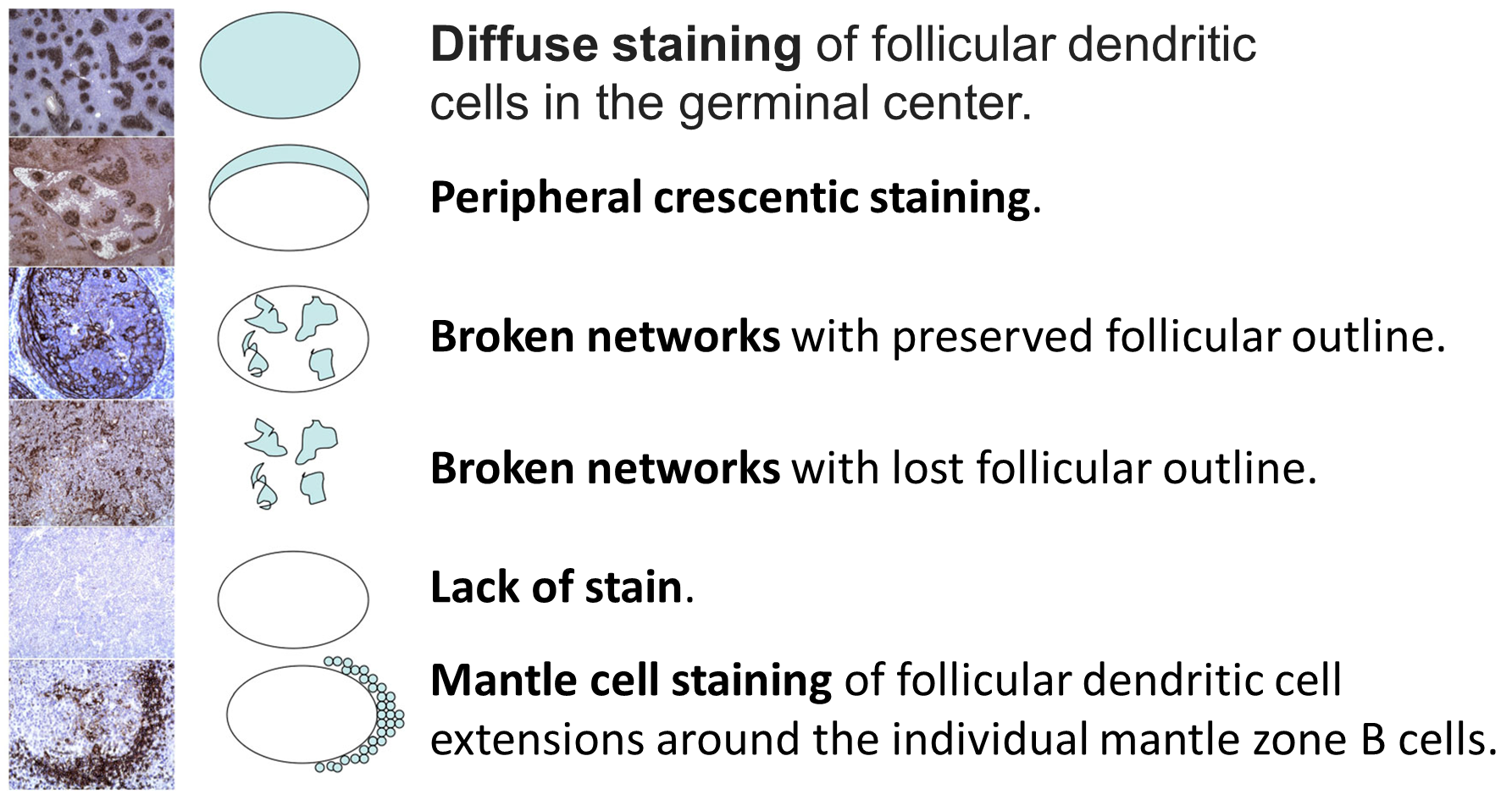
Patterns of CD21 (or CD23) expression by the follicular dendritic cells in follicular lymphoma

Although CR2 is present on all mature B-cells and follicular dendritic cells (FDCs), this becomes readily apparent only when immunohistochemistry is performed on frozen sections. In more conventional paraffin-embedded tissue samples, only the FDCs retain the staining pattern. As a result, CR2, more commonly called CD21 in the context of immunohistochemistry, can be used to demonstrate the FDC meshwork in lymphoid tissue.

This feature can be useful in examining tissue where the normal germinal centres have been effaced by disease processes, such as HIV infection. The pattern of the FDC meshwork may also be altered in some neoplastic conditions, such as B-cell MALT lymphomas, mantle cell lymphoma, follicular lymphoma and some T cell lymphomas. Castleman's disease is typified by the presence of abnormal FDCs, and both this, and malignant FDC tumours may therefore be demonstrated using CR2/CD21 antibodies.
