= XB1 =

XB1, XB-1, or variant, may refer to:

== Vehicles ==
- Huff-Daland XB-1, or Keystone XB-1, a prototype bomber aircraft built for the United States Army Air Corps
- Engineering Division XB-1, or Dayton-Wright XB-1, an American version of the Bristol F.2 Fighter aircraft
- Buell XB1, a motorcycle by Buell Motorcycle Company
- XB-1 Baby Boom, an American supersonic aircraft by Boom Technology

== Video games ==
- Xbox One, the third installment in the Microsoft Xbox series of home video game consoles
- Xbox (console), the first installment in the Microsoft Xbox series of home video game consoles

== Other uses ==
- XB-1, Fondu fyre cement mixture
- XB1, a variant of the Daewoo Precision Industries K2 assault rifle
- XB-1 (magazine), Czech science fiction, fantasy, and horror magazine

== See also ==
- 1993 XB1 or 7351 Yoshidamichi, an asteroid
- Ikarie XB-1
- XBI (disambiguation)
- XBL (disambiguation)
- XB (disambiguation)
