= Regulatory B cell =

Type of immune cell

Regulatory B cells (Bregs or B_{reg} cells) represent a small population of B cells that participates in immunomodulation and in the suppression of immune responses. The population of Bregs is highly heterogeneous and can be separated into different subsets such as B10 cells, memory B cells, transitional B cells, marginal zone B cells, Br1 cells, GrB^{+}B cells, CD9^{+} B cells and even some plasmablasts or plasma cells, with reported phenotypic differences between subsets described in humans and mice. Bregs regulate the immune system by different mechanisms. One of the main mechanisms is the production of anti-inflammatory cytokines such as interleukin 10 (IL-10), IL-35, or transforming growth factor beta (TGF-β). Another known mechanism is the production of cytotoxic Granzyme B. Bregs also express various inhibitory surface markers such as programmed death-ligand 1 (PD-L1), CD39, CD73, and aryl hydrocarbon receptor. The regulatory effects of Bregs were described in various models of inflammation, autoimmune diseases, transplantation reactions, and in anti-tumor immunity.

== History ==
The history of Breg research is can be described as progressing through four eras: early functional discovery (1960s–1990s), term coining and initial phenotypic characterization (2000s), mechanistic and therapeutic expansion (2010s), and the current omics-driven phase (2020s–onwards). In the 1960s-1970s it was noticed that B cells could suppress immune reaction beyond antibody production. In 1996 Janeway's group observed an immunomodulation of experimental autoimmune encephalomyelitis (EAE) by B cells. Similar results were shown in a model of chronic colitis one year later. Then a role of Bregs was found in many mouse models of autoimmune diseases as rheumatoid arthritis or systemic lupus erythematosus (SLE).

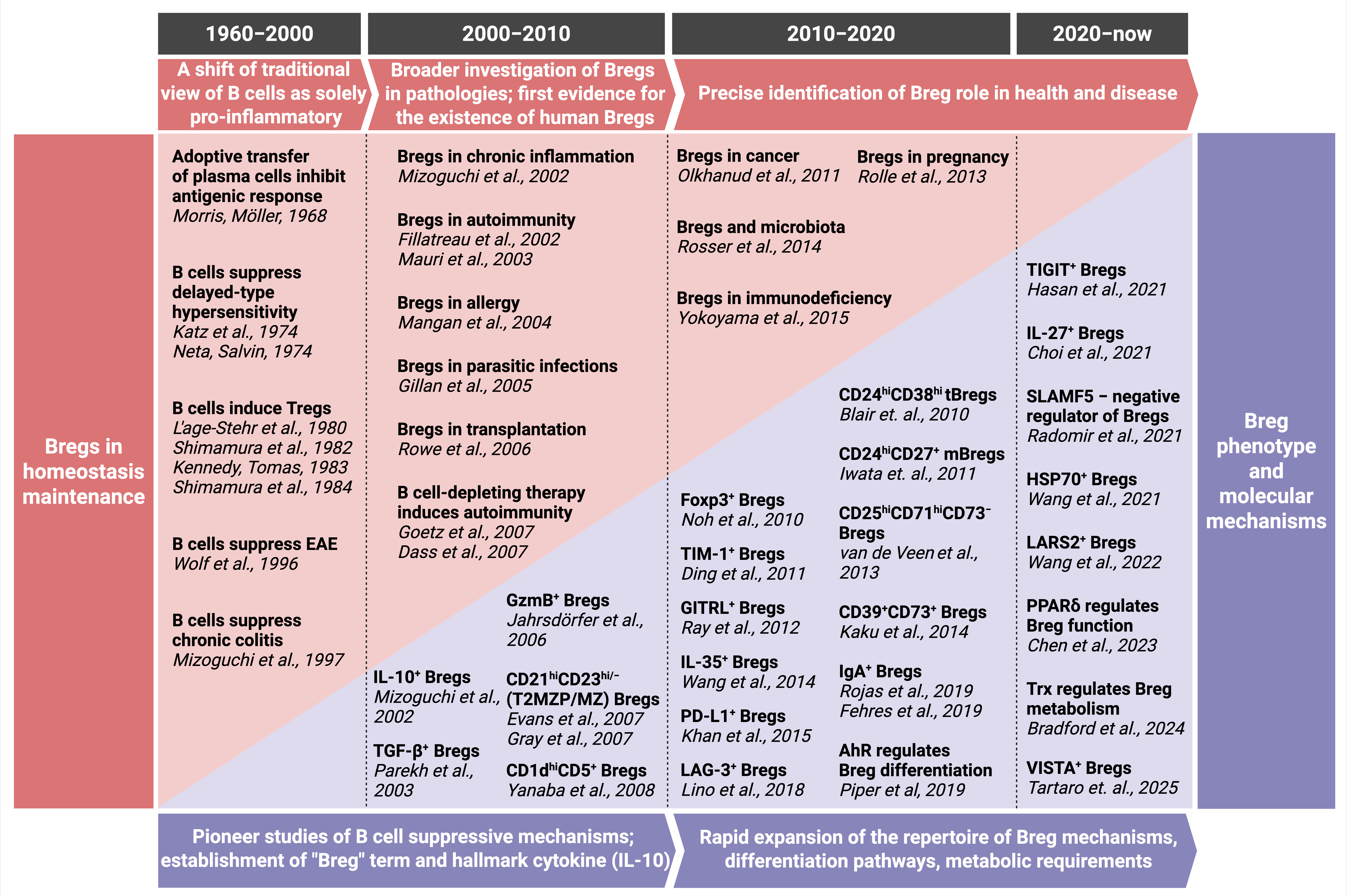
Timeline of Breg journey

Timeline of Breg journey. EAE, experimental autoimmune encephalomyelitis; GzmB, granzyme B; LARS2, leucine-tRNA-synthetase-2; PPARδ, peroxisome proliferator-activated receptor delta; Trx, thioredoxin.

== Development and populations ==
Bregs can develop from different subsets of B cells such as immature and mature B cells or plasmablasts. Whether Breg cells uniquely derive from a specific progenitor or originate within conventional B cell subsets is still an open question. Unfortunately, Breg cells are more difficult to define than regulatory T cells (Tregs) since they lack a lineage marker analogous to the Treg cell marker - FOXP3. Bregs share many markers with various B cell subsets due to their origin. Human and murine Bregs can be further separated into many subsets due to their different mechanism of action and distinct expression of key surface markers (table below). It is estimated that IL-10 producing B cell subpopulations can constitute up to 10% of circulating human B cells. There is still no clear consensus on the classification and definition of Breg cells. Mouse Bregs were mainly CD5 and CD1d positive in the model of EAE or after the exposition of Leishmania major. By contrast, mouse Bregs in model of collagen-induced arthritis (CIA) were mainly CD21 and CD23 positive. Bregs were found in humans, too. Markers of peripheral blood Bregs were molecules CD24 and CD38. However, peripheral blood Bregs were mostly CD24 and CD27 positive after cultivation with anti-CD40 antibody and CpG bacterial DNA. They were also positive for CD25, CD71 and PD-L1 after stimulation by CpG bacterial DNA and through TLR9.

Breg subsets identified in human or mice
| Subset | Species | Phenotype | Function |
|---|---|---|---|
| B10 cells | human, mouse | CD24^{hi}CD27^{+} (human), CD5^{+}CD1d^{hi} (mouse) | production of IL-10, suppression of effector CD4^{+} T cells, monocytes, and DCs |
| Plasmablasts | human, mouse | CD19^{+}CD24^{hi}CD27^{int} (human), CD138^{+}CD44^{hi} (mouse) | production of IL10 and TGF-β, suppression of DCs and effector CD4^{+} T cells |
| Plasma cells | mouse | CD138^{+}MHC-11^{lo}B220^{+} | production of IL-10 and IL-35, suppression of NK cells, neutrophils, and effector CD4^{+} T cells |
| Marginal zone B cells | human, mouse | CD19^{+}CD21^{hi}CD23^{−} | production of IL-10, induction of Treg cells, suppression of effector CD4^{+} and CD8^{+} T cells |
| Br1 cells | human | CD19^{+}CD25^{hi}CD71^{hi} CD73^{−} | production of IL-10, suppress inflammatory responses, induction of Treg cells and promotion of IgG4 production |
| GrB^{+}B cells | human | CD19^{+}CD38^{+}CD1d^{+}IgM^{+}CD147^{+} | production of granzyme B, degradation of T cell receptor, inhibition of CD4^{+} T cell proliferation and Th1 and Th17 responses |
| CD9^{+} B cells | human, mouse | CD19^{+}CD9^{+} | production of IL-10, suppression of Th2 and Th17 inflammation |
| CD5^{+}CD1d^{+} cells | human | CD19^{+}CD5^{+}CD1d^{hi} | production of IL-10, suppression of Th17 response |
| B1a cells | mouse | CD19^{+}CD5^{+} | production of IL-10, suppression of TLR-mediated inflammation |
| Killer B cells | mouse | CD19^{+}CD5^{+}FasL^{+} | induction of T cell death |
| Tim-1^{+} B cells | mouse | Tim−1^{+}CD19^{+} | production of IL-10, enhance Th2 and Treg responses, regulation of Th1 and Th17 cells during inflammation |
| Transitional 2-marginal zone precursor cells | mouse | CD19^{+}CD21^{hi}CD23^{hi} | production of IL-10, suppression of effector CD4+, CD8+ T cells and induction of Treg cells |

== Mechanisms of action ==
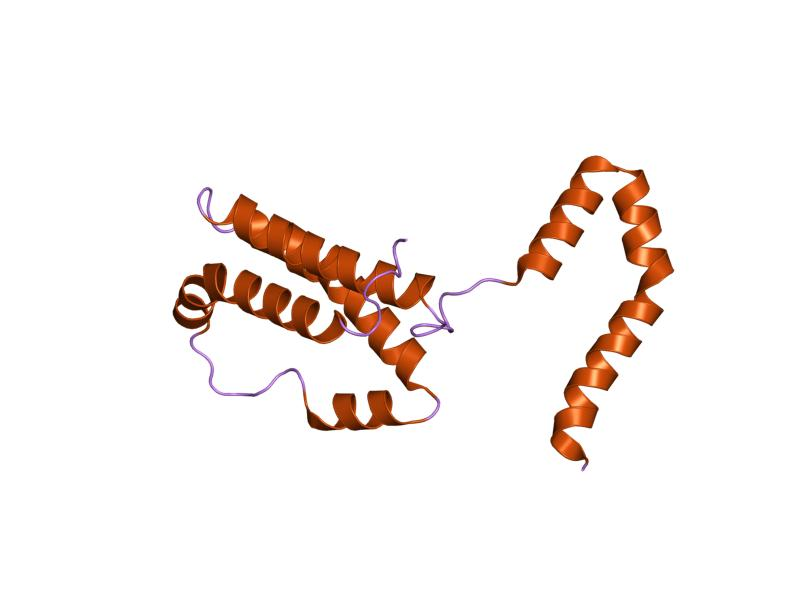
Structure of interleukin 10 (IL-10). Key player in Breg biology.

There are several mechanisms of Breg action. Nevertheless, the most examined mechanism is the production of IL-10. IL-10 has strong anti-inflammatory effects. It inhibits (or suppresses) inflammatory reactions mediated by T cells, especially Th1 and Th17 type immune reactions. This was shown for example in the models of EAE, CIA or contact hypersensitivity. Likewise, regulatory B cell subsets have also been demonstrated to inhibit Th1 responses through IL-10 production during chronic infectious diseases such as visceral leishmaniasis. By production of IL-10, Bregs are also capable of conversion of naïve CD4^{+} T cells into Tregs and IL-10-secreting type 1 regulatory CD4^{+} T cells. This has been observed in various experimental models as well as chronically virus-infected patients. Another mechanism of Breg suppression is the production of transforming growth factor (TGF-β), an anti-inflammatory cytokine. The role of Bregs producing TGF-β was found in the mouse models of SLE and diabetes. The last anti-inflammatory cytokine produced only by some Bregs is IL-35, which plays a role in Treg conversion. Breg cells are capable of releasing IL-35 containing exosomes. It is not yet clear whether IL-10 and IL-35-producing Bregs correspond to separate populations or display some degree of overlap. Besides the production of immunomodulatory cytokines, Bregs also release cytotoxic granzyme B involved in the degradation of the T cell receptor and T cell apoptosis. Another mechanism of Breg suppression involves surface molecules such as FasL, which induces T cell death, or PD-1 and PD-L1. PD-1^{+} Bregs have been shown to suppress CD4^{+} and CD8^{+} T cell activity and induce Tr1 cells, while PD-L1 Bregs were reported to inhibit NK and CD8^{+} T cell cytotoxicity. Some Bregs also express additional suppressive molecules such as CD39, CD73, and aryl hydrocarbon receptor.

== Activation ==
Resting B lymphocytes do not produce cytokines. After the response to antigen or different stimuli such as lipopolysaccharide (LPS) pro- and anti-inflammatory cytokines TNFα, IL-1β, IL-10 and IL-6 are produced. This indicates that the Breg must be stimulated to produce suppressive cytokines. There are two types of signals to activate Breg, namely signals generated by external pathogens (PAMPs) and endogenous signals produced by the action of body cells. PAMPs are recognized by the toll-like receptors (TRLs). TLRs trigger a signal cascade at the end of which is the production of effector cytokines. Bregs are mainly generated after the recognition of TLR4 or TLR9 ligands - LPS and CpG. The main endogenous signal is the stimulation of the surface molecule CD40. Some anti-inflammatory factors, such as IL-35 and retinoic acid have also been proposed to induce Breg phenotype. Additionally, cytokine IL-21 together with CD40 ligand and/or TLR9 signals has been shown to induce B10 generation and the emergence of IL-10 producing plasmablasts during inflammatory processes. Moreover, treatment of primary human B cells with a combination of CD40L, CpG and IL-21 is particularly effective for inducing functionally active transitional (CD24^{hi}CD38^{hi}) and memory (CD24^{hi}CD27^{+}) Breg subsets ex vivo, providing conditions that may be useful for potential adoptive Bregs transfer.

== Autoimmune diseases ==
Bregs are studied in several human autoimmune diseases such as multiple sclerosis (MS), rheumatoid arthritis, SLE, type 1 diabetes, or Sjögren's syndrome. Generally, Breg cells seem to be important in preventing autoimmune diseases and are often reported reduced or with impaired inhibitory abilities in autoimmunity.

=== Multiple sclerosis ===
The main reported mechanism of Breg reduction of MS is the production of IL-10, IL-35, and TGF- β. Bregs have been extensively studied in the mouse model of multiple sclerosis - EAE, where the depletion of Bregs worsened the disease and increased the number of autoreactive T cells, but it is not clear whether the frequencies of Breg cells are altered in MS patients. Although one study reported normal Breg frequencies in MS patients, a few others have observed a decreased amount of Breg cells in patients. It has been reported that an approved medication for MS treatment Glatiramer acetate increases Breg frequencies and enhances their function. Similarly, Alemtuzumab, which is an antibody that binds CD52 of T and B cells and causes apoptosis or cell lysis, increases the frequency of Bregs in patients with relapsing MS.

=== Systemic Lupus Erythematosus ===
It has been observed that patients with SLE have deficiencies in the function of Bregs. Bregs isolated from patients had been reported to lose their regulatory capacity and be unable to inhibit the expression of pro-inflammatory cytokines IFN-γ and TNF-α by CD4^{+} T cells compared to Bregs from healthy donors. Several studies have also noted a decrease in the percentage of IL-35^{+}and IL-10^{+} Bregs cells in SLE patients.

=== Type 1 Diabetes ===
In mouse models, IL-10-producing Bregs have been shown to control autoimmune diabetes. In type 1 diabetes (T1D), the evidence suggests that IL-10–producing Bregs are numerically and functionally defective in patients compared to healthy donors. Bregs in T1D have decreased production of IL-10 and are unable to suppress Th1 and Th17 immune responses. Moreover, these defective Bregs are unable to convert naive CD4^{+} T cells in Tregs.

== Tumors ==
Tumor-infiltrating B lymphocytes consist of various phenotypes, including both effector and regulatory B cells. IL-10 or Granzyme B-producing Bregs have been detected in various human cancers. Additionally, most studies have reported a positive correlation between Breg cells and Treg cells, which indicated an interaction between these subsets. It has been observed that higher frequencies of IL-10-producing B cells were observed in late-stage disease samples than in early-stage samples of esophageal cancer. Leukemia B cells spontaneously produce large amounts of IL-10. Moreover, increased levels of Bregs were detected in the peripheral blood and bone marrow of patients with acute myeloid leukemia. IL-10-producing Bregs are also present in gastric cancer, breast cancer, head and neck squamous carcinoma, and esophageal squamous carcinoma. The evidence suggests an immunosuppressive Breg role in cancer and it is possible that cancerous proliferation uses Bregs for its escape from the immune response.

== Transplantation ==
It has been reported that patients undergoing kidney transplantation who were subjected to B-cell depletion therapy showed a higher incidence of graft rejection. The evidence shows that immunosuppressive properties of Bregs might play an essential role in allotransplants. Murine models of allotransplantation showed that Bregs increased the duration of allograft survival and controlled Th17, Tfh, and follicular regulatory T-cell differentiation. In other types of transplants, B cells can participate both in tolerance and in transplant rejection, depending on the origin of the Breg subpopulation.
