= Y-320 =

Names
- Preferred IUPAC name 1-(4-Chlorophenyl)-N-{3-cyano-4-[4-(morpholin-4-yl)piperidin-1-yl]phenyl}-5-methyl-1H-pyrazole-4-carboxamide
- Other names AGN-PC-03MFTL; SureCN6052244; Y-320-5mg; Y-320-10mg; Y-320-25mg; Y-320-50mg; s7516; IL-17 Inhibitor

Identifiers
CAS Number	288250-47-5
3D model (JSmol)	Interactive image
ChemSpider	11239888
PubChem CID	22227931
UNII	82S7NR4B46
CompTox Dashboard (EPA)	DTXSID101031899
- InChI: InChI=1S/C27H29ClN6O2/c1-19-25(18-30-34(19)24-5-2-21(28)3-6-24)27(35)31-22-4-7-26(20(16-22)17-29)33-10-8-23(9-11-33)32-12-14-36-15-13-32/h2-7,16,18,23H,8-15H2,1H3,(H,31,35) Key: BWZNJVZTAWBIFG-UHFFFAOYSA-N; InChI=1S/C27H29ClN6O2/c1-19-25(18-30-34(19)24-5-2-21(28)3-6-24)27(35)31-22-4-7-26(20(16-22)17-29)33-10-8-23(9-11-33)32-12-14-36-15-13-32/h2-7,16,18,23H,8-15H2,1H3,(H,31,35) Key: BWZNJVZTAWBIFG-UHFFFAOYSA-N
- SMILES: O=C(C1=C(C)N(C2=CC=C(Cl)C=C2)N=C1)NC(C=C3)=CC(C#N)=C3N(CC4)CCC4N5CCOCC5

Properties
Chemical formula	C_{27}H_{29}ClN_{6}O_{2}
Molar mass	505.01116 g/mol
Density	1.347 g/cm3
Boiling point	631.225 °C (1,168.205 °F; 904.375 K) at 760 mmHg

Hazards
Flash point	335.553 °C (635.995 °F; 608.703 K)
- Except where otherwise noted, data are given for materials in their standard state (at 25 °C [77 °F], 100 kPa). Infobox references

Y-320 is an orally active immunomodulator, and inhibits IL-17 production by CD4 T cells stimulated with IL-15 with IC_{50} of 20 to 60 nM.

== Biological activity ==
=== In vitro ===
Y-320 also inhibits the production of IFN-γ and TNF-α by mouse CD4 T cells stimulated with IL-15, CXCL12, and anti-CD3 mAb.

=== In vivo ===
Y-320 (0.3-3 mg/kg p.o.) ameliorates collagen-induced arthritis (CIA) in mice with a reduction of IL-17 mRNA in arthritic joints, and also shows therapeutic effects on CIA in cynomolgus monkeys. Moreover, Y-320 shows a synergistic effect in combination with anti-TNF-α mAb on chronic-progressing CIA in mice.
