= XBS =

XBS may refer to:

- Xiamen Gaoqi railway station (station telegraph code XBS), Huli, Xiamen, Fujian, China
- XBS, Japanese rapper, a member of Suite Chic
- XBS Swimming, a swim club in Slovakia; see List of Slovak records in swimming
- .xbs, the file extension for xBscript; see Windows Script Host
- Tenascin X, a glycoprotein also called "XBS"
- XMM-Newton Bright Source Catalogue (XBS), an astronomical catalogue; see List of astronomical catalogues
- Daewoo XB-S, a variant of the Daewoo Precision Industries K2 South Korean assault rifle
- Freightliner XB-S, a truck chassis; see Long Beach Bus

== See also ==
- XB (disambiguation) for the singular of XBs
