= B10 =

B10, B X or B-10 may refer to:

== Transportation ==
=== Automotive ===
- B10 (1930s New York City bus) serving Brooklyn
- B10 road (Cyprus)
- B10 biodiesel blend: 10% biodiesel, 90% petrodiesel is labeled B10
- B-10 motorway (Spain), a ring motorway around Barcelona
- Bundesstraße 10, a federal highway in Germany
- B-10 or H-10, a Boxer engine or horizontally opposed 10-cylinder internal combustion engine configuration
- Alpina B10 Bi-Turbo, a high performance version of the BMW 5 series

=== Other transportation ===
- Bavarian B X, an 1890 German locomotive model
- Bensen B-10, a 1958 American unconventional aircraft
- HMS B10, a British B-class submarine
- Martin B-10, a US bomber

== Other uses ==
- Big Ten Conference
- B10 cell, a lymphocyte type
- B-10 recoilless rifle, a rifle used by the Soviet Army
- B10 when relating to Functional Safety, the number of operations that a devices will operate prior to 10% of a sample of those devices would fail. B10d is the same calculation, but where 10% of the sample would fail to danger.
- 10 amp, type B – a standard circuit breaker current rating
- Caro–Kann Defence, an Encyclopaedia of Chess Openings designation
- An international standard paper size, defined in ISO 216
- Boron-10, a stable isotope of boron

== See also ==
- 10B (disambiguation)
