= Bayport Aerodrome =

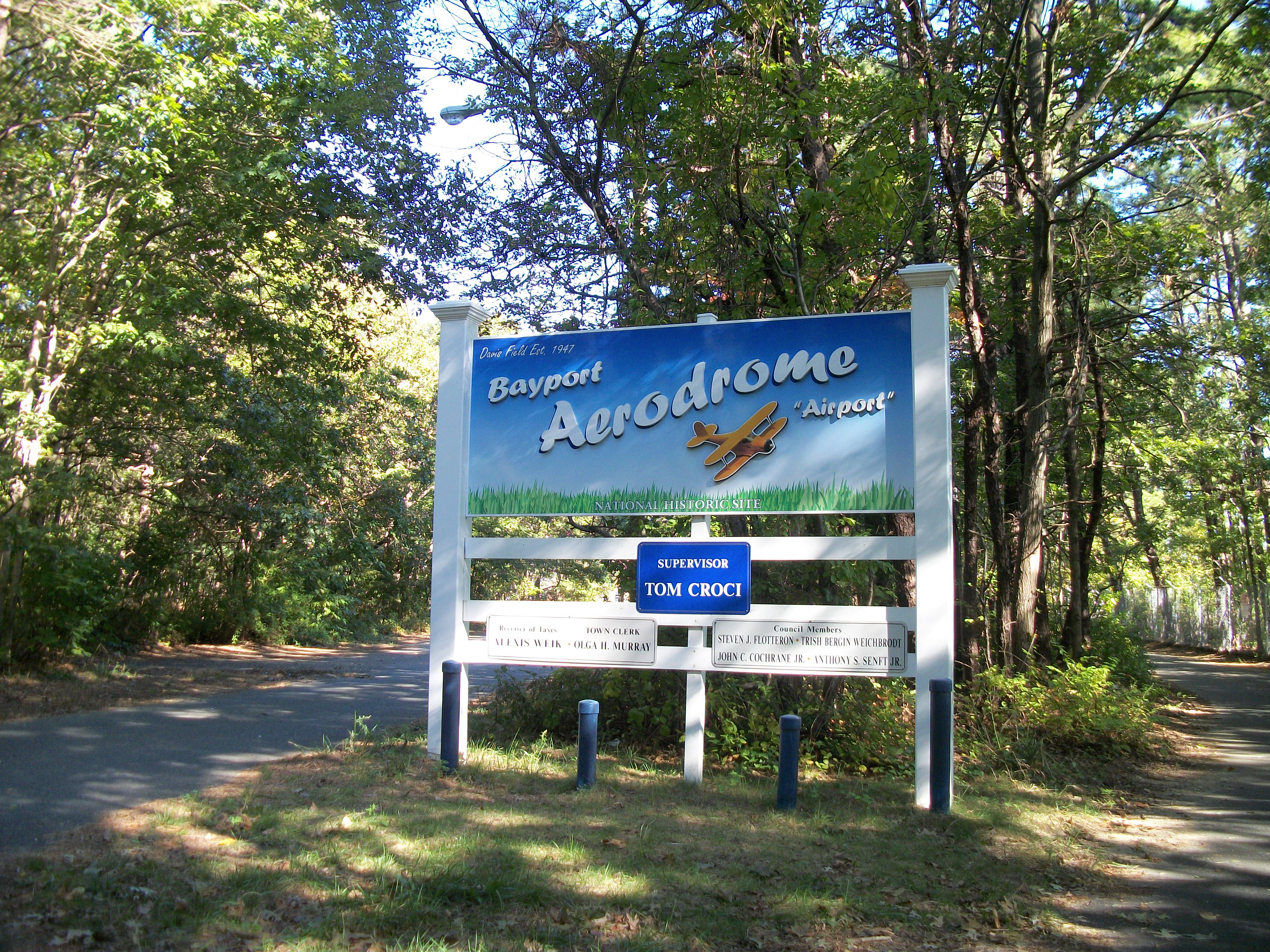
- The entrance to Bayport Aerodrome
- IATA: none; ICAO: none; FAA LID: 23N

Summary
- Airport type: Public/Antique
- Owner/Operator: Town of Islip
- Location: Bayport, New York
- Opened: October 1945
- Elevation AMSL: 41 ft (12 m)
- Coordinates: 40°45′30.3″N 73°03′13.4″W
- Website: www.bayportaerodromesociety.com
- Interactive map of Bayport Aerodrome

Runways
Direction	Length		Surface
Direction	ft	m	Surface
18/36	2,740	835	Grass
- Davis Field
- U.S. National Register of Historic Places
- U.S. Historic district
- Location within New York Location within the United States
- Location: 60 Vitamin Dr., Bayport, New York
- Area: 59.9 acres (24.2 ha)
- Built: 1945
- Architect: Davis, Curtis, Sr.
- NRHP reference No.: 07001456
- Added to NRHP: January 22, 2008

Bayport Aerodrome (FAA LID: 23N), formerly known as Davis Field and Edwards Airport, is a historic rural airport and living history museum located 1 mile (1.6 km) northwest of Bayport, Long Island, New York, United States.

== History ==
The airport was established in October 1945 on a portion of local farmer Curtis Davis's cornfield by his son, a World War II Civil Air Patrol pilot. Davis sold the airport in 1953 to George Edwards – the owner of a flight school at the former Flushing Airport in Queens; the field's name subsequently changed to Edwards Airport.

In 1972, the Bayport Aerodrome Society – a historical society focused on antique aircraft – was founded. The Town of Islip purchased the property in 1978, after Edwards sold the property to a developers who had proposed erecting 138 homes and a waste disposal facility on the site, much to the chagrin of local residents & aircraft owners, who protested the sale. Many of the aircraft owners took legal action to stop the sale, as they held leases in perpetuity at the airport for storing their aircraft. The Town of Islip secured Federal Aviation Administration grants and ultimately preserved the airport, in partnership with the Bayport Aerodrome Society. The airport's name changed to Bayport Aerodrome in 1980.

In 1985, after the Bayport Aerodrome Society leased property from the town, it erected a complex of 24 hangars at the airport for antique aircraft.

On January 22, 2008, the airport was listed on the National Register of Historic Places as a national historic district.

== Facilities and aircraft ==
Bayport Aerodrome one grass runway – Runway 18/36; it measures 2,740 by 150 feet (835 m × 46 m) in length. It does not have a control tower or a beacon – nor are any instrument approach procedures (IAPs) available.

The airport is home to the Bayport Aerodrome Society – a non-profit historical society that specializes in antique airplanes, which was established in 1972. Several antique airplanes are also based at the airport, including in hangars.

== Airport operations ==
Bayport Aerodrome is owned by the Town of Islip.

Unlike the town's other airport – Long Island MacArthur Airport in nearby Ronkonkoma, the Bayport Aerodrome is not used for commercial aviation.

== See also ==
- List of airports in New York
- Transportation on Long Island
- Cradle of Aviation Museum
- American Airpower Museum
