= Nassau Inter-County Express =

Public transportation organization in New York

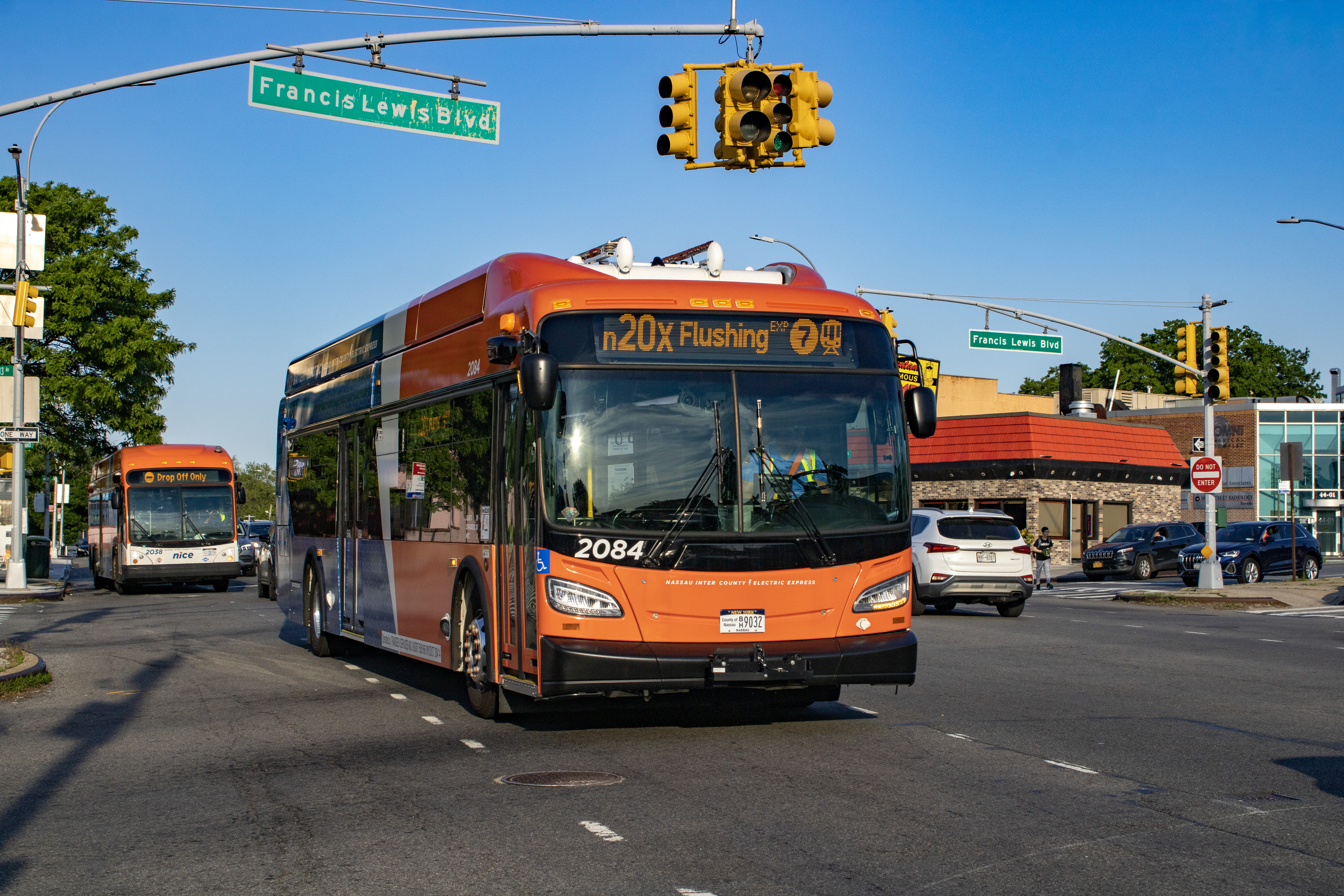
- 2 NICE buses in Auburndale, Queens
- Parent: Nassau County, New York (fleet ownership)
- Commenced operation: January 1, 2012 (as NICE)
- Headquarters: East Garden City, New York
- Locale: Nassau County, New York
- Service area: Most of Nassau County (except for northern Town of Oyster Bay), parts of Queens and Suffolk County
- Service type: Bus service; Microtransit; Paratransit
- Routes: 42(fixed routes including one seasonal) 2(shuttle routes)
- Hubs: 4 major bus hubs, 33 LIRR stations, and 5 New York City Subway stations
- Fleet: ~ 278 fixed-route, 122 Able Ride
- Daily ridership: 71,746 (weekday 2024)
- Fuel type: CNG/Battery Electric (fixed-route); Diesel (Able-Ride)
- Operator: Transdev
- Chief executive: Jack Khzouz (September 2018)
- Website: nicebus.com

Nassau Inter-County Express (NICE) is the public transit bus system in Nassau County, New York, on Long Island. NICE routes operate across Nassau County, with some routes serving destinations in Suffolk County and the New York City borough of Queens. NICE service is coordinated by the Nassau County government and operated by Transdev.

NICE is the successor of MTA Long Island Bus, which began operation in 1973 after Nassau County bought out ten private bus companies. MTA Regional Bus Operations operated Nassau County bus service until 2012, when the county switched operations to a private contractor after a funding dispute. NICE bus services connect to MTA services, including the Long Island Rail Road and New York City bus services, and NICE buses accept the regional MetroCard and OMNY fare systems.

== History ==
=== Private companies (pre-1973) ===
In the mid-1960s, 17 private bus companies served Nassau County, which operated under franchises granted by the county. County operation was considered but not acted upon in 1963. On February 20, 1967, at the request of Nassau County Executive Eugene H. Nickerson, County Supervisor Michael N. Petito introduced legislation to the Board of Supervisors to allow Nassau County to take over the operation of the bus lines.

On August 22, 1970, the New York State Public Service Commission (PSC) authorized Hempstead Bus Corporation, Schenck Transportation, Rockville Centre Bus Company, and Stage Coach Lines to take over the routes operated by Semke Bus Lines and Mid Island Transit effective August 24. Those two companies had ended operations on August 14 after the PSC had denied their requests to increase fares from 20 to 35 cents.

On April 13, 1971, the president of Hempstead Bus sent a letter to Nassau County Executive Ralph G. Caso saying that it might have to significantly reduce service, noting increasing costs for materials and labor, competition from cars, and the high interest rates needed to finance the 20 new buses it placed into service in August 1970. One of the routes that might need to be cut was an experimental route set up on August 21 between county office buildings in Mineola and the South Shore. Caso announced an agreement with the company on April 23 in which the county would purchase the 20 new buses the company had acquired in 1970 and lease them back to the company, which would have to repay the county within five years.

On May 22, 1971, Metropolitan Transportation Authority (MTA) Chairman William J. Ronan committed to Caso that the MTA would conduct a thorough study of Nassau's bus transportation needs, focusing on cross-county routes, and routes that feed Long Island Rail Road (LIRR) stations. On August 20, 1971, Caso announced an agreement with the MTA to seek $500,000 from the state's supplemental budget to push off Stage Coach Lines' planned abandonment of its four routes, primarily to the Mid-Island Shopping Plaza that were set to begin that weekend. Schenck also planned to make cuts in evening and weekend service on September 1, 1971. Under the agreement, it would not make those cuts, and would take over Stage Coach's routes.

In his State of the County speech on February 7, 1972, Caso recommended having the Metropolitan Transportation Authority (MTA) take over the operations of some of the county's bus companies, and said a formal request to the MTA for a takeover would be made within 90 days. In April 1972, Schenck filed with the New York State Department of Transportation for a fare increase of about 30 percent, or 10 cents a zone for the first two fare zones, to take effect on July 3, 1973. The one-zone fare would go from 35 to 45 cents, and the two-zone fare would go from 50 to 60 cents, while three-zone trips would stay at 75 cents. The increase would replace state and county subsidies that were in place for the previous 18 months. The county was providing $256,000 for six months through June 30, while the state was providing $400,000 for a year. Schenck said it planned to eliminate all or most service after 9 p.m. and to eliminate weekend service. Saturday service on the N23, N25, and N57B, and Sunday service on the N22B, N24, N32C, N32W, and N33 would be eliminated.

Caso announced on June 14, 1972 that the county's 10 private bus operators would be taken over by a public agency for $10 million, and would either be operated by an authority set up by the county or the MTA. The takeover would be completed-either through condemnation or negotiated purchases-by the first quarter of 1973. After resisting for several years, Caso decided to push for public operation after the operators of the bus companies asked the county to continue and increase the subsidies they had been provided by the county for the previous six months to maintain service. Nassau had paid the ten operators $409,000 in the first six months of the year, and would pay $400,000 more through the end of 1972. Caso said he preferred a takeover by the MTA. $3 million of the $10 million for the takeover would come from the MTA and the state. The county was expected to have to cover the operation's deficit of $500,000 to $1 million a year. A report by the Nassau County Department of Transportation on the planned takeover said that Nassau's bus ridership had decreased by 112 percent in the previous year. The report said takeover would allow for the acquisition of new buses, including 50 new buses immediately, a revised fare structure including lower fares in many cases, and rationalized and expanded bus service, including the coordination of routes and schedules with those of the LIRR.

The County Board of Supervisors voted to take over ownership of the ten companies on October 30, 1972. The law did not specify whether the county or MTA would operate the bus routes. On December 27, 1972, Nassau County Executive Ralph G. Caso and MTA Chairman William J. Ronan announced the creation of a new MTA subsidiary, the Metropolitan Suburban Bus Authority, to take over the operations of 10 private bus companies by April 1, 1973. The Nassau County Transportation Commissioner Andrew G. Schiavone would lead the agency. The county was expected to pay $14 million to the companies in condemnation proceedings, with $9 million from Federal funds.

=== MTA Long Island Bus ===
MTA Long Island Bus

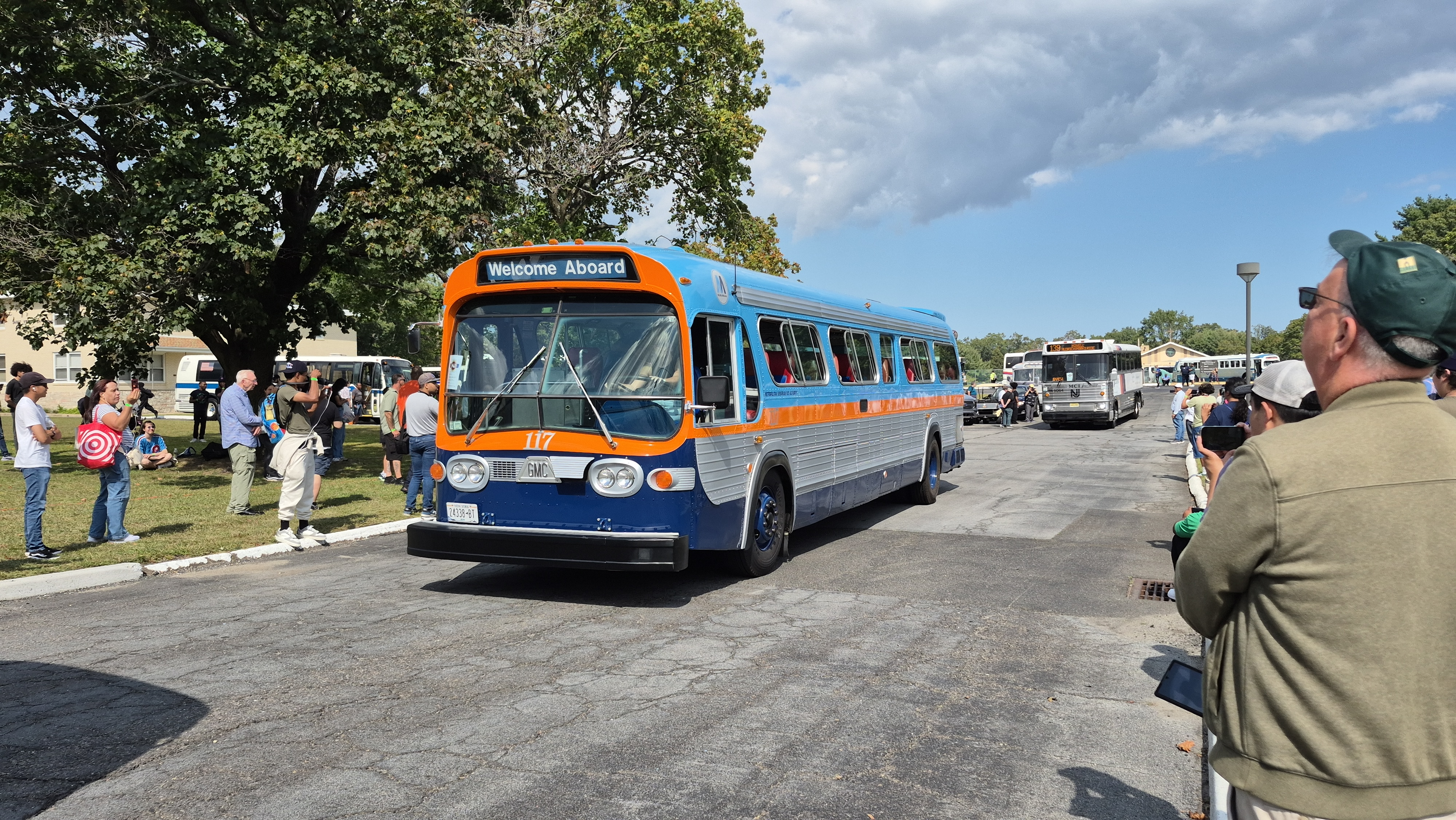
- A preserved Metropolitan Suburban Bus Authority GM New Look bus at a 2025 event
- Formerly: Metropolitan Suburban Bus Authority
- Commenced operation: June 1973
- Ceased operation: December 31, 2011
- Service area: Nassau County, New York
- Operator: MTA Regional Bus Operations

During the first week of April 1973, Nassau County took over operation of four of the ten private bus companies (Bee Line, Rockville Centre Bus, Utility Lines, Stage Coach). This had been set to take place the previous week, but was postponed due to legal technicalities. The other six companies (Roosevelt Bus Line, Schenck Transportation, Branch Bus Corporation, Jerusalem Avenue Bus Line, Universal Auto Bus, Hempstead Bus Corporation) were expected to be taken over later in April. In March 1973, County Executive Caso said that an agreement had been reached with the Amalgamated Transit Union and the United Transportation Union following discussions in Washington that would allow the county and the MSBA to modify, eliminate, or add new bus routes, consolidate bus garages, and assign personnel to those routes and garages without needing to take into consideration the union or geographical areas the workers belong to. It would cost the county approximately $29 million over five years to purchase and operate the routes. The agreement with the MTA would be renewed every year, and both sides had the right to end the agreement on 60 days' written notice.

On May 30, 1973, Nassau County signed a contract to take over all ten private bus companies in the county. The county would subsidize service until it could become self-sustaining, and would have to pay $5.6 million by June 15, which was the original offer it had made to the companies for their capital assets. The county would lease its buses to the Metropolitan Suburban Bus Authority (MSBA), a wholly owned subsidiary of the Metropolitan Transportation Authority. The federal government would pay $9 million, which was about two-thirds of the capital cost. 18 new buses were ordered for $40,000 each. The MSBA started operating the system in June 1973. Of the 298 vehicles acquired, 50 required major repairs, and 24 were unusable. Nassau County implemented a half-fare program for the elderly during certain weekday hours and on weekends following county ownership.

In October 1974, the MSBA said it started a comprehensive study on how to improve bus service in the county. It was funded by a $108,000 grant from the MTA, and a $212,000 grant from the Urban Mass Transportation Administration (UMTA). The same month, the first 15 of 50 new buses were placed into service.

Service was eliminated on seven routes and cut on three other routes on January 5, 1975 due to the MSBA's budget crisis. Nassau had budgeted $5.2 million to fill part of the MSBA's potential deficit of $6.8 million in 1975. These cuts were expected to save $1 million. Headcount at the MSBA would have to decrease by 25. The MSBA hoped to use federal and state aid to cover the remainder. The N19 would be truncated from Patchogue to Babylon since it operated at a deficit, despite high ridership, and was used by a large number of residents of Suffolk County Suffolk County Executive Klein met with directors of four bus companies in the county to take over this route section. Three Saturday-only bus routes (N7, N72, N74) and two weekday-only routes (N20, N67), along with special event buses from Queens and Nassau to the Nassau County Coliseum would be discontinued. The N52 and N52B would terminate at the Hempstead bus terminal instead of running along Fulton Avenue or Broad Street in West Hempstead, and the N79 would be rerouted between the Walt Whitman Shopping Center and Mineola. N79 bus service would no longer run along Broadway to Old Country Road and Round Swamp Road, but would continue along Plainview Road to Old Country Road and Manetto Hill Road. Some late night and early morning trips on routes were also discontinued, as were some trips during the day. The need for cuts was announced by the MSBA on November 14, 1974. The executive assistant to the head of the MSBA had said that the cut in the N19 could have been averted if Suffolk was willing to give the agency $250,000.

A public hearing was held on March 24, 1976, on the MTA's proposed simplified fare structure, which would replace the system of zone fares that was in place before the MSBA takeover. Fares consisted of 25 to 40 cents for the first zone and a charge of 5 to 20 cents for each additional zone, and zones covered areas with distances anywhere between 1 and 10 miles apart. The MTA's proposal would have a flat fare of 50 cents for buses in Nassau, and 75 cents between Nassau and Suffolk. Fares from Queens would be 50 cents to the Nassau County line, 65 cents to Great Neck, Franklin Square, Lynbrook, Elmont, New Hyde Park, Valley Stream, and most of Roslyn and Mineola, and 75 cents to points further east. There would be free transfers in Nassau for up to two trips on buses in the same general direction. Student fares would be 35 cents on all routes, and 50 cents on routes into Queens. In addition, half fares would be implemented for the handicapped and elderly, and the UniTicket discount program for riders to and from Long Island Rail Road (LIRR) stations would be expanded to be available at all 43 stations on the LIRR served by the MSBA on Long Island, along with Far Rockaway in Queens. Unitickets had been available for sale on a pilot basis at Massapequa Park, Freeport, Little Neck, Great Neck, and Rockville Centre since fall of 1975. The fare structure would also include a lower 35 cent fare for short trips, such as between Point Lookout and Long Beach, and on short loops to the Massapequa Park, Freeport, Rockville Centre, and Great Neck LIRR stations. On May 17, 1976, a spokesperson for the MTA said the new fare structure would take effect on May 30.

In September 1976, a bus transit center opened at the Great Neck LIRR station to allow the creation of a system of buses timed to arrive at the stations at the same time, permitting short transfers to many other bus routes, and to enable short connections to LIRR trains. Buses would run to Great Neck every 30 or 60 minutes outside rush hour, when some routes would run more frequently. One windy route was split into two more direct routes, a short section of one route was discontinued, routes were rerouted, and one bus was renumbered. The N21 was rerouted to detour from Northern Boulevard to serve the station, N21 trips that begin in Roslyn would be renumbered the N20 and be extended from Old Northern Boulevard and Mineola Avenue to Roslyn station via Mineola Avenue and Warner Avenue. The N20 would operate hourly on weekdays, with more frequent service during rush hours. Other buses would be rerouted, and the N77 would become the N27. The N20, N21, N25, N56, N57, N58, and N59 would start to serve the station starting September 13, 1976.

On September 4, 1977, major changes were made to three bus routes. Service on the N79 would be extended to the Plainview County Complex, and would be doubled to operate every 30 minutes instead of every 60 minutes. The N82 would be extended through Hicksville to Jericho Turnpike and North Broadway to serve the Mid-Island Plaza and provide a new north-south route with connections to the LIRR at both Bellmore and Hicksville. The N72B would be extended to the Sunrise Mall via South Farmingdale and be relabeled as the N71. Buses would run every hour between 8 a.m. and 10 p.m. on weekdays and Saturdays. The N71 would take a more direct route to Farmingdale than the N72B, by operating via Hempstead Turnpike, instead of operating through North Levittown and Bethpage, saving up to ten minutes. In addition, the N51 was slightly rerouted to serve Nassau Community College and Hoftra University, and peak service was increased on busy routes, including the N4, N6, N15, N40, and N41. Due to low ridership, Saturday service on the N56, N57, N72C, and N72G would be discontinued.

The MTA Board, on June 9, 1978, voted to seek a $605,000 grant from the UMTA to create four new bus transfer centers at the Mineola, Lynbrook, Rockville Centre, and Freeport LIRR stations. The county would contribute $108,000 to the project. Most of the funds would go to hiring 30 new employees, mainly bus operators. The MSBA wanted to implement the plan at Freeport and Rockville Centre by January 1979, and at Mineola and Lynbrook by June 1979.

In November 1978, an MTA spokespersons said that five routes (N51, N53, N59, N79A, N82) might be eliminated as early as January, affecting 5,000 riders, and service on 21 other routes might be cut if Nassau did not provide an additional $1.5 million in subsidy. The cuts would cause 20 to 30 of the 450 bus operators to be laid off.

On August 27, 1980, the MSBA held a public hearing on proposed changes to bus service. These included the extension of N22 Sunday service from Roosevelt Field to Mid-Island Plaza to match Monday to Saturday service, and the creation of the N51 route, which would operate between Merrick and Roosevelt Field via Nassau Community College and Merrick Avenue. Service would run every 60 minutes, and would operate between 6 a.m. and 7 p.m. on weekdays, and between 8 a.m. and 6 p.m. on Saturday. On December 17, 1980, the MSBA held a public hearing on proposed changes to bus service. These included the start of Sunday bus service on the N71, the extension of N39 Sunday service from Nassau County Medical Center to Mid-Island Plaza to match Monday to Saturday service, and the creation of the N55, which would mainly replace the N52. The N52 ran between Hempstead and Seaford via Jerusalem Avenue, while the N55 would run between Hempstead and the Sunrise Mall via Jerusalem Avenue, Broadway, and Sunrise Highway.

In March 1981, officials from Nassau County announced that a new bus depot would be constructed at Mitchel Field for $23.5 million. Construction was set to start in 1983 if the plan got approved that month. The maintenance shops at Uniondale and Amityville would close after the new facility was completed in 1984.

On September 6, 1981, the N20 route was extended from Roslyn to Hicksville to serve the New York Institute of Technology, the New York Chiropractic College, C. W. Post College Center, and SUNY-Old Westbury. Buses would no longer stop at Roslyn station. Buses would arrive at the schools 15 minutes before classes and depart 10 to 30 minutes after they end. In addition, new weekend service would begin on the Hempstead to Sunrise Mall route. On January 3, 1982, Sunday service began on the N1 and N25 routes, weekday N23 service began running every 30 minutes instead of every 60 minutes, the N36 was truncated from Hempstead to Lynbrook, and the N31 and N32 were extended from Lynbrook to Hempstead.

The MSBA held a public hearing on May 4, 1982 on several proposed changes to bus service. The N39D would be renumbered the N48, the N39C would be renumbered the N49, the N38 would be renumbered the N47, the N42 would be discontinued, a new N46 route would be created between Hempstead, the N27 would be rerouted during rush hours from Clinton Road and Stewart Avenue via Westbury Boulevard, Oak Street, Commercial Avenue, and Quentin Roosevelt Boulevard, weekday and Saturday N37 service would be extended from Atlantic Avenue and Grand Avenue to Baldwin Harbor Junior High School via Atlantic Avenue and Grand Boulevard, a new N50 route would be created, providing new weekday service between Bellmore and Hicksville via Bellmore Avenue, North Jerusalem Road and Newbridge Road, a new N70 route would be created to run on weekdays between Hempstead and Farmingdale via Hempstead Turnpike, Melville Road, Smith Street, and Pinelawn Road, serving the Route 110 corridor and SUNY-Farmingdale, the N72 would be improved, the N72C and N72G loop routes would be discontinued and replaced by the N70, N71, N72, and N73. A new N74 route would be created, running between Wantagh and Hicksville on weekdays via Wantagh Avenue, Hempstead Turnpike, and Jerusalem Avenue.

Changes would also be made to summer Jones Beach bus service. The JB53 route from Farmingdale would be discontinued due to low ridership, the JB21 route from Flushing would be combined with a portion of the JB57 route from Great Neck by running via the Great Neck LIRR station, with the remainder of the JB57 eliminated, the Queens portion of the JB22 route from Jamaica via Jamaica Estates, Fresh Meadows, and Glen Oaks would be discontinued, the JB24 from Jamaica via Jericho Turnpike would be combined with a portion of the JB51, and he JB39 from Hicksville via Newbridge Road would be renumbered JB50. In addition, fares on the buses to Jones Beach (other than the routes from Freeport and Wantagh) would increase by 25 to 75 cents depending on distance traveled. The new N46, N50, N70, and N74 routes would serve growing industrial areas in the eastern and central portions of the county and a new Hicksville transit hub. On June 11, 1982, the MTA approved these changes, which took effect on June 20. This was the largest increase in bus routes since the MSBA takeover.

A public hearing was held on March 15, 1984 on proposed service adjustments. The MSBA proposed eliminating the N69 on March 20, 1984 with service to be replaced by the City of Long Beach. On June 17, 1984, the N56 and N57 Great Neck routes would be discontinued, weekend service would be implemented on the N20, and Sunday N23 service would be extended from Roslyn to Manorhaven to match weekday service. For the 1984 summer season for Jones Beach, the JB21 would be discontinued, and the JB80, JB73, and JB50 would be consolidated into a new JB50 route from Mid-Island Plaza in Hicksville.

On June 17, 1985, the MSBA began a pilot route, the N28, between Roslyn and the Roslyn North Industrial Park. The route would operate every 30 minutes on weekdays between 6:50 and 9:20 a.m. and between 3:35 and 6:05 p.m. The route was created after a request was made by multiple businesses in the complex to the Town of North Hempstead. In December 1985, the route was made permanent. At the time, the route was used by 150 riders a day. On June 22, 1987, rush hour N24 bus service was extended from Roosevelt Field to 90 Merrick Avenue via the Mitchel Field complex, Hempstead Turnpike, and Glenn Curtiss Boulevard.

The 1990s saw the creation of a shuttle around Roosevelt Field (N93, now discontinued), two shuttles designed to take customers from train stations to work sites (the N94 and N95, both discontinued), and a service connecting Nassau County to JFK Airport (the N91, now discontinued). The system's name was also changed from Metropolitan Suburban Transportation Authority to MTA Long Island Bus in 1994, as part of a systemwide MTA rebranding.

On April 30, 1994, the MSBA started a new shuttle bus between Woodbury and Hicksville station in coordination with the LIRR. Buses would make four rush hour round trips to Gateways Commercial Park and Crossways Commercial Park, and run from the two office parks to Woodbury Commons Mall at lunch time. The shuttle was expected to reduce car use by about 200 cars a day.

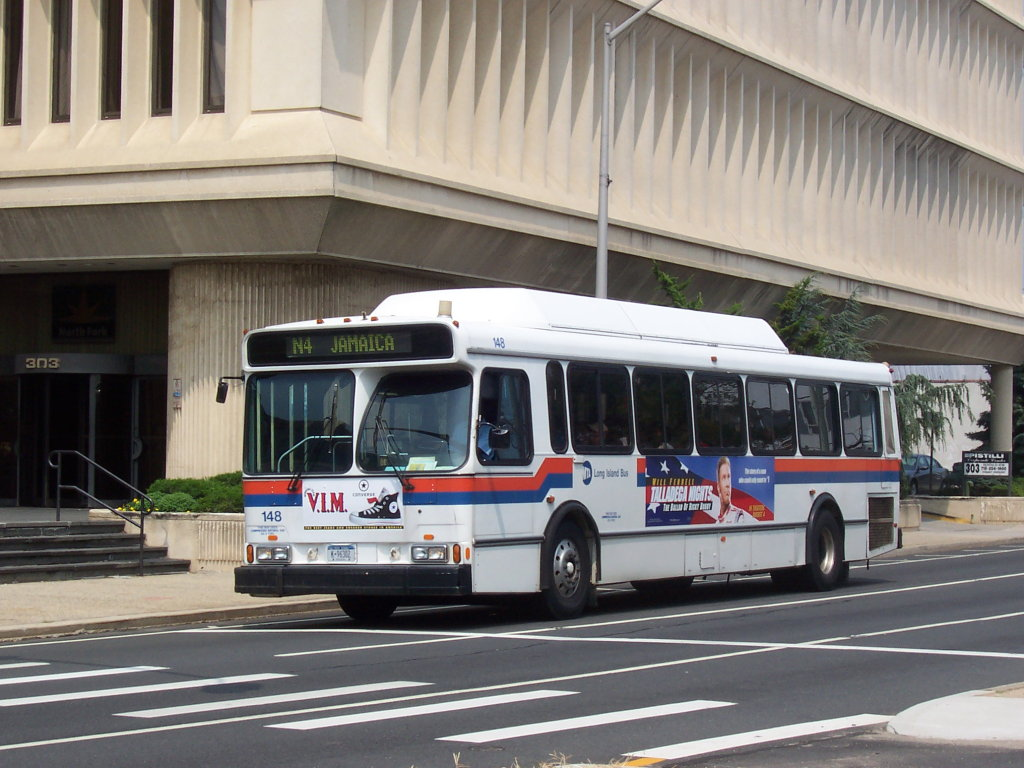
MTA Long Island Bus Orion V in Lynbrook, 2006

On November 18, 2002, Long Island Bus introduced the Merrick Shuttle routes (N52 and N53) on a pilot basis to connect to the LIRR station and help ease a shortage of parking at the station. Service consisted of approximately 25-minute long western and eastern loops that met LIRR trains during rush hours. Two minibuses provided the service. Riders could flag down the buses anywhere along their routes. The routes for the N52 and N53 were determined using LIRR Mail and Ride data. An introductory fare was provided until January 3, 2003. This project followed an unsuccessful attempt by the New York State Department of Transportation, the Town of Islip, Suffolk Transportation, and the Tri-State Transportation Campaign to run a jitney to and from the Central Islip LIRR station. In December 2002, ridership on the Merrick Shuttle was about 50 a day. In June 2007, the N52 and N53 buses were merged into one, the N53 which would eventually be discontinued in June 2010.

In 2003, Long Island Bus improved service to Hempstead using Federal funding available through the Job Access Reverse Commute (JARC) program from the Transportation Equity Act for the 21st Century. LI Bus created the N8 and N43 routes, and added Sunday service on the N27.

In 2007, Long Island Bus averaged over 109,000 weekday riders, many of which include customers connecting to other MTA services in the region. By 2011, the MTA had averaged 101,981 weekday riders by the time of the agency's exit from operating the service.

=== Privatization and NICE ===
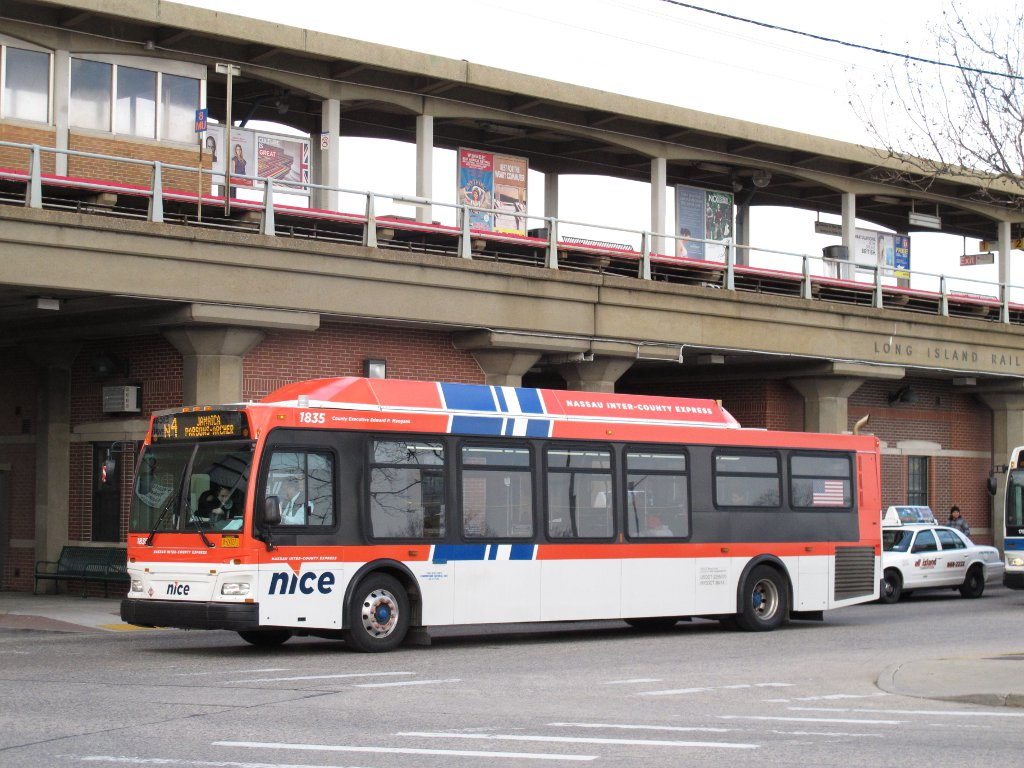
A NICE bus at Freeport LIRR station in 2012, the first year of operation as NICE

In 2010, the future of MTA Long Island Bus became uncertain, as the MTA threatened drastic cuts due to Nassau County's disproportionately small contributions to the operation. Since 2000, the MTA had provided a unique subsidy (of $24 million in 2011 and over $140 million since 2000) to the Nassau County bus system that the other New York City suburban county bus systems did not receive. The county's contribution was $9.1 million per year out of a total budget of $133.1 million, and the MTA wanted this contribution to increase to $26 million. Critics noted that Westchester County subsidized its similarly sized Bee-Line Bus System service by $33 million/year, and that Suffolk subsidized its substantially smaller Suffolk County Transit system by $24 million/year. The county hoped to reduce its contribution from $9.1 million to $4.1 million by using a private contractor; the planned county contribution was later decreased to $2.5 million/year.

By March 2011, the MTA—citing Nassau's refusal to pay its contracted amount—proposed a set of major service reductions which would have eliminated 27 of its 48 routes and affected about 15 percent of its ridership, with the greatest impact on southeastern Nassau County, eliminating all routes operating south of Hempstead Turnpike and east of the Meadowbrook State Parkway (except for the N71). Service would have been eliminated on the N1, N2, N8, N14, N19, N31, N33, N36, N45, N46, N47, N50, N51, N54, N55, N57, N58, N62, N72, N74, N78, N79, N80, and N81, on Saturday on the N16, and on Sunday on the N25. In addition, Able-Ride paratransit service along the fixed route services would be discontinued. A public hearing was held on March 23 on the proposed route changes and on the possible termination of the lease and operating agreement with Nassau County.

After reviewing the service cut plans, County Executive Ed Mangano considered severing ties with the MTA and privatizing the Long Island Bus system. A temporary reprieve, via additional state funding, would have sustained service through the end of 2011. In April 2011, the MTA voted to cease all bus service in Nassau County after the end of 2011. Mangano then announced that he had retained Veolia Transport to operate the system beginning in 2012 through a public-private partnership, pending legislative approval.

In November 2011, Veolia and Mangano announced that the service was going to be renamed Nassau Inter-County Express (or NICE), upon Veolia's takeover of the system. All buses, including Able-Ride vehicles, would receive a new paint scheme to reflect the change. On December 12, 2011, the county legislature unanimously approved the Veolia contract, which was subsequently approved by the state-controlled Nassau County Interim Finance Authority on December 22, 2011. Veolia took over operations on January 1, 2012. The Veolia plan was the subject of heated county public hearings, in which Long Island Bus riders & employees criticized the plan.

In February 2012, Veolia announced service cuts and adjustments to take effect in April 2012. While there were no route cancellations planned, just over $7 million in cuts to existing routes were planned, with service reductions and route concentrations planned for routes primarily serving northern and eastern Nassau County, beginning in spring 2012, with resources redirected towards busier routes. These cuts ultimately included decreased service on 30 routes, including the elimination of weekend service and decreased midday service on seven routes. These cuts were criticized as occurring too soon, only six weeks after starting service.

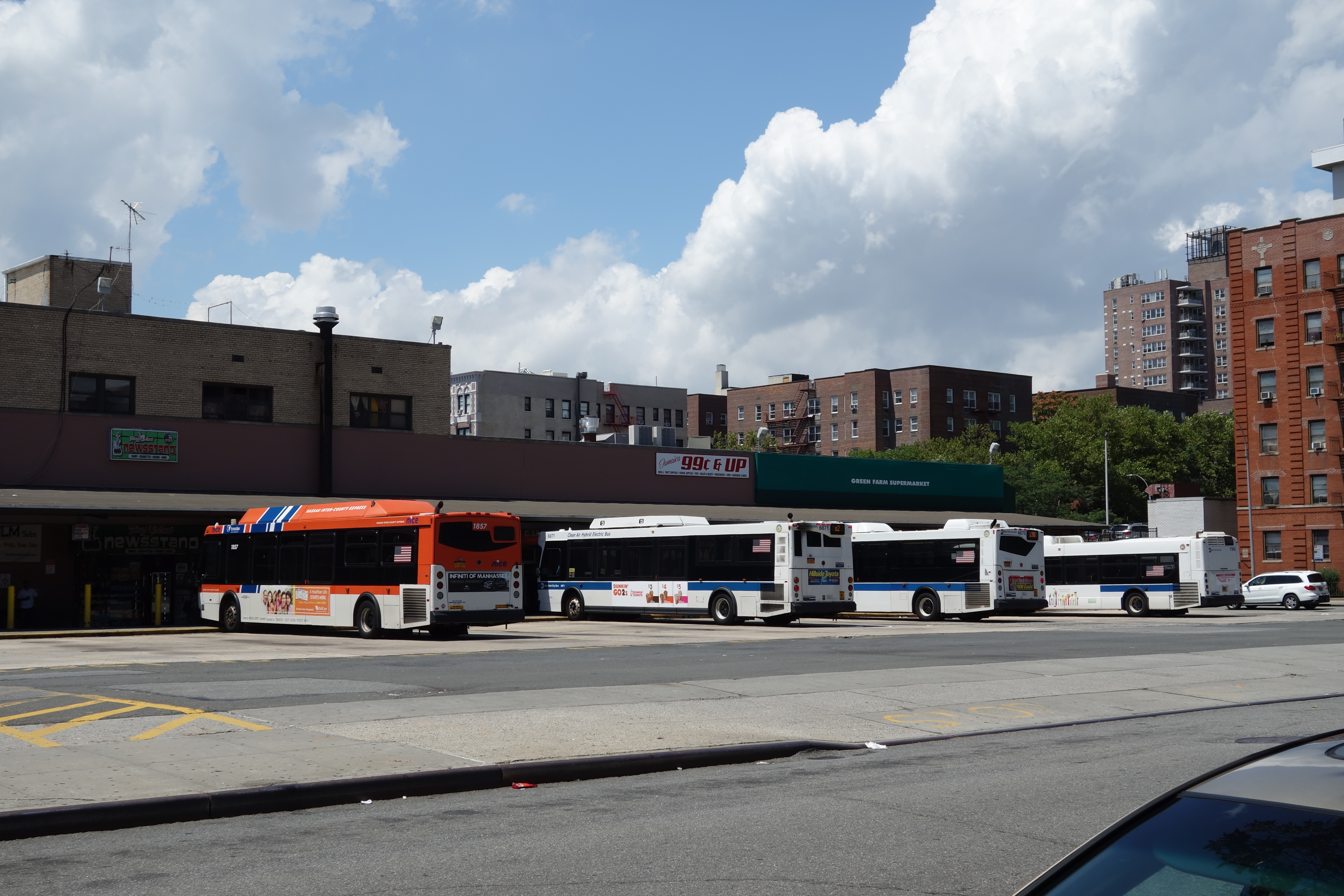
NICE and MTA buses at the 165th Street Bus Terminal in Queens, 2018

In 2013, the NICE bus system obtained a "windfall" from increased New York State aid of $5 million and $3 million from a fare increase for MetroCard bus riders. In March 2014, the NICE bus system faced another $3.3 million budget deficit. At that time, the bus system expected an additional $1.2 million in state aid. On October 31, 2014, the Nassau County Legislature adopted a 2015 budget that would increase Nassau County's contribution to NICE bus from $2.6 million to $4.6 million in 2015 and promised not to raise fares outside of MetroCard fare increases. This new $4.6 million contribution was hailed as a victory for Nassau County bus riders, although it still left NICE bus with a $6 million operating deficit. However, on December 11, 2014, Nassau County executive Ed Mangano proposed cutting $4 million from Nassau County's NICE bus contribution, in addition to cuts to numerous other Nassau County services, to replace the $30 million that would be lost after the shutdown of Nassau County's controversial school speed zone cameras.

On January 17, 2016, NICE eliminated fifteen routes due to a budget deficit and low ridership and restructured three other routes. On June 27, 2016, NICE restored service on two routes (n80/81) and restored two others (n14, n17) as shuttles. On September 6, 2016, NICE restored service on one route (n51) and restored three others (original n2, n62, n73) as shuttles. In December 2016, NICE announced a $12 million budget shortfall for FY2017 and warned of additional service cuts. These cuts were proposed to the Transit Advisory Committee, but failed to pass. A more severe set of cuts was passed in February, eliminating ten routes and reducing service on four routes. Many of these routes were the ones restored in 2016. Additional last-minute state funding allowed service on three routes to be saved. The cuts took effect on April 9, 2017.

In July 2018, a multi-year plan to restructure and improve service on the system was released for public comment. Improvements included a more developed frequency network, the restoration of former services, and new express bus service to Manhattan.

A Gillig BRT (2122) on the n20G to Great Neck

NICE services were affected by the COVID-19 pandemic beginning in early 2020. Fare collection was temporarily suspended from March to June, with passengers required to board through the back door of buses. Services were temporarily reduced from April to June due, and bus capacity was limited to approximately 25 passengers. NICE began providing real-time crowding information through mobile apps in the fall of 2020, helping passengers avoid crowded buses.

A microtransit service branded as NICE Mini was introduced in 2022. As of 2025, NICE Mini service is available in the South Shore region, serving a corridor from Lynbrook to Merrick.

== Fare ==
Fares can be paid with a MetroCard (including unlimited cards), OMNY, coins, or on the GoMobile app. Dollar bills are not accepted on any NICE fixed-route buses. Transfers are available upon request with coins, and are included automatically with MetroCard and OMNY. The transfers are valid for two hours and can be used on two connecting NICE bus routes. Transfers are also valid on Suffolk County Transit, Long Beach Bus, Huntington Area Rapid Transit (HART) or MTA New York City Transit, with the following restrictions:

- Transfers to non-MetroCard buses are with coins only.
- Transfers to the New York City Subway, or New York City Bus or MTA Bus express service, are available with MetroCard or OMNY only (express buses require additional fare).
- Transfers from Suffolk Transit, Huntington Area Rapid Transit (HART) or Long Beach Bus require payment of a $0.25 fare.

The full-fare fare is $3.00, the senior and disabled fare is $1.50, and the children's fare is $2.25. Children under 44 inches ride for free. A single-ride GoMobile Ticket is $4.00 20-trip packages are available for regular and senior and disabled fares, with one free ticket provided. Student fares are free and student passes are issued to students on request by their school system. These passes are only valid for travel in Nassau County on Mondays to Fridays during the school year from 6 a.m. to 7 p.m. for travel to or from school. The Able-Ride paratransit fare is $4.00, payable in Able-Ride tickets or exact fare.

Fares were increased to $2.90 ($1.45 for seniors and disabled customers) from $2.75 ($1.35) on August 20, 2023. Fares were increased again to $3 ($1.50) on January 4, 2026.

OMNY became available on NICE buses beginning on January 4, 2026. OMNY has a weekly fare cap; after riders pay $35 ($17.50 for reduced-fare customers) within seven days of an initial tap, they receive unlimited rides for the rest of that seven-day period.

== Bus depots ==
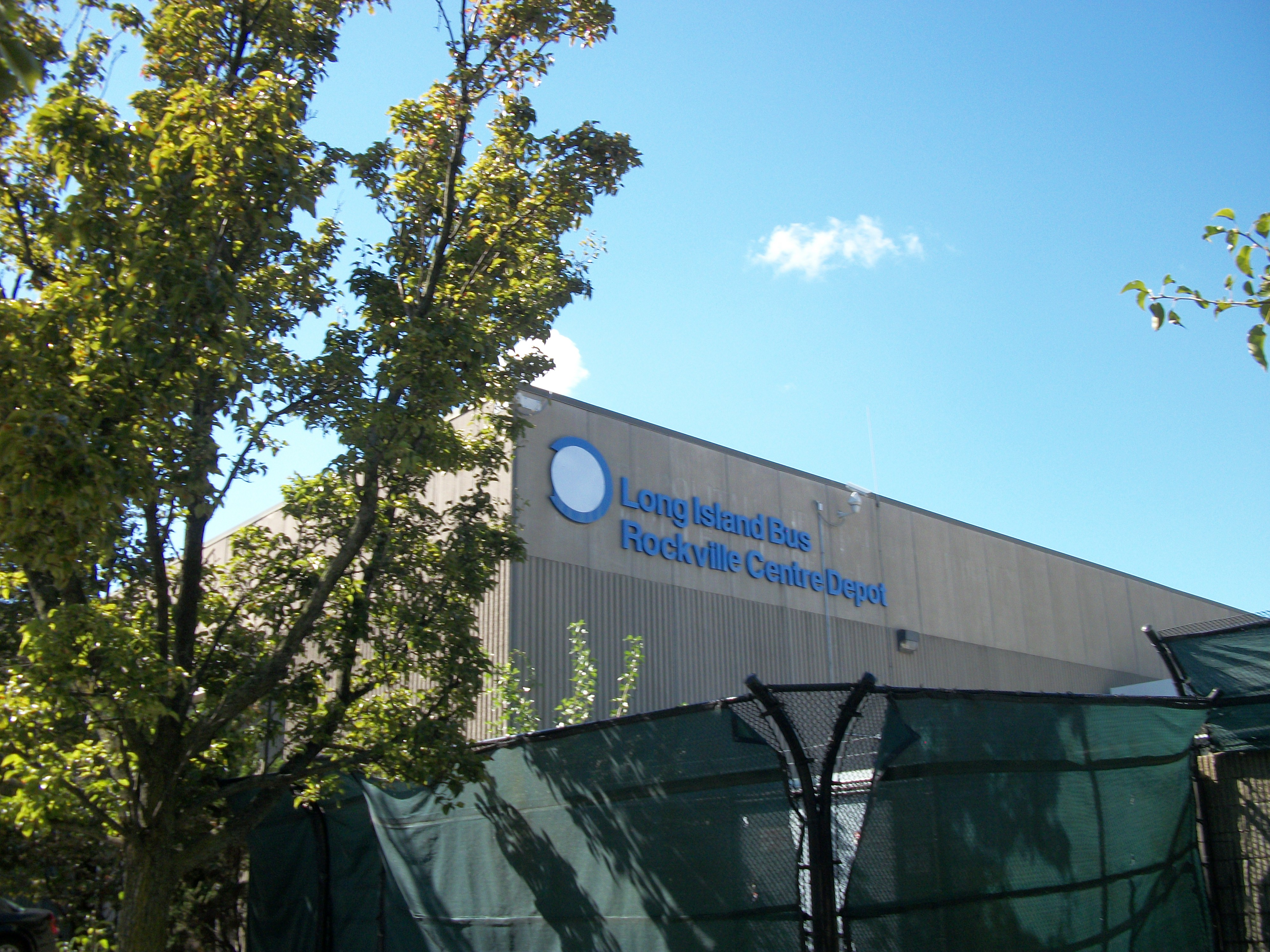
The Rockville Centre Bus Depot in 2012. Note the MTA logo painted over.

Nassau Inter-County Express has two operating depots – one each for its fixed route and paratransit operations – and one former depot.

=== Current ===
==== Senator Norman J. Levy Transit Facility ====
The Senator Norman J. Levy Transit Facility (originally Mitchel Field Depot) is located at 700 Commercial Avenue in the East Garden City section of Uniondale, and is the headquarters and central garage for Nassau Inter-County Express fixed route service.

Opened in 1978, the garage was initially named after the Mitchel Air Force Base that had previously occupied that site from 1918 until 1961. All routes are dispatched from this garage. It handles both 60-foot articulated buses and 40-foot buses.

==== Stewart Avenue Depot ====
The Stewart Avenue Depot is located at 947 Stewart Avenue – also in the East Garden City section of Uniondale. All Able-Ride Nassau County shared-ride ADA paratransit service is dispatched from this garage.

=== Inactive ===
==== Rockville Centre Depot ====
The Rockville Centre Bus Depot (previously known as the Bee Line Bus Garage) is located at 50 Banks Avenue in Rockville Centre. First established in 1936, this garage was originally the home of Bee Line, Inc, and was closed in 2017 as part of a cost-cutting move.

In July 2025, it was announced during a NICE bus committee meeting that NICE plans to rehabilitate the Rockville Center Depot for future zero emissions bus operations.

== Fleet ==
All fixed-route NICE buses are ADA compliant and semi low-floor. All buses are also equipped with "smart bus" technology from Woodbury-based Clever Devices, which includes automated onboard route and stop announcements. However, Nassau Inter-County Express has recently hired Clever Devices again to replace its original "smart bus" system in most of the fleet with new on-board units and software that use GPS data to calculate the next stop announcements instead of odometer-based data with the older system. The new system will also provide maintenance with vehicle diagnostics data and provide customers and dispatchers alike with real-time bus location data accessible online (akin to MTA Bus Time).

=== Active bus fleet ===
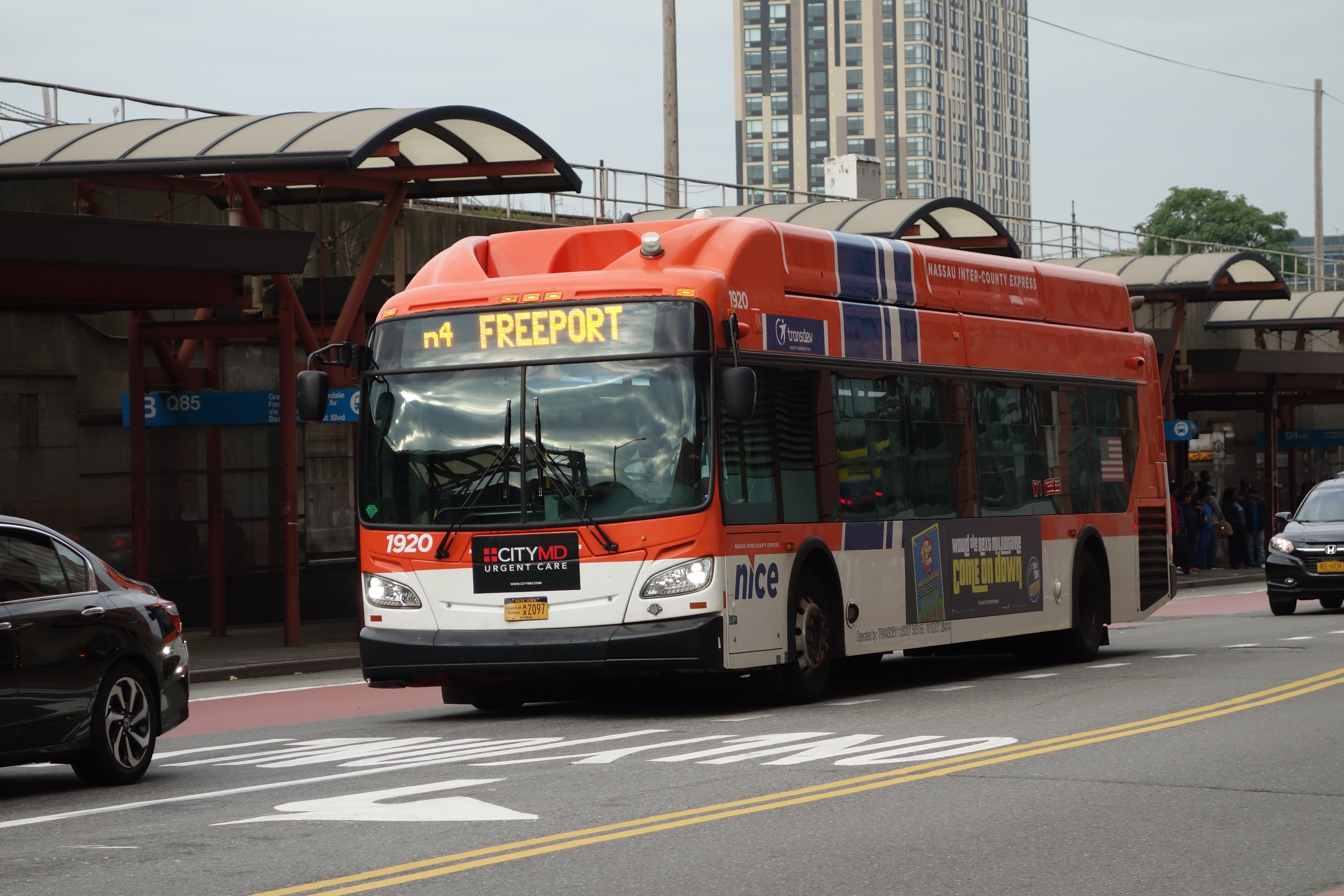
A New Flyer XN40 operating on route n4

==== Fixed-route fleet ====
Image	Type	Model year	Length	Numbers (Total)	Approximate Amount active	Energy Source
	New Flyer; XN40 Xcelsior	2015-2016	40 ft (12 m)	1885-1964 (80 buses)	78	CNG
	New Flyer; XN60 Xcelsior; Articulated	2016	60 ft (18 m)	1965-1969 (5 buses)	5	CNG
2019 NFI XN40 #1975 on the N20G	New Flyer; XN40 Xcelsior	2020-2021	40 ft (12 m)	1970–1979 (10 buses)	10	CNG
2021 NFI XN40 #1989 on the N20X	New Flyer; XN40 Xcelsior	2020-2021	40 ft (12 m)	1980-1999 (20 buses)	20	CNG
	Gillig; Advantage BRT Plus	2021-2022	40 ft (12 m)	2000-2079 (80 buses)	80	CNG
	Gillig; Advantage BRT Plus	2021-2022	40 ft (12 m)	2086-2118 (33 buses)	33	CNG
	New Flyer; XE40 Xcelsior CHARGE	2023-2024	40 ft (12 m)	2080-2085 (6 buses)	6	Battery electric
	Gillig; Advantage BRT Plus	2025-2026	40 ft (12 m)	2119-2159 (41 buses)	41	CNG
	Gillig; Advantage BRT Plus	2025-2026	40 ft (12 m)	2160-2164 (5 buses)	5	CNG

==== Future Fixed-route fleet ====
NICE Bus has order for 50 new CNG 40ft buses due for delivery in 2028. In addition,more electric buses are pending for arrival in the late 2020s. As with the MTA, NICE also plans to use only zero emissions buses from 2040 onward.

==== Paratransit, Shuttle, & NICE Mini fleet ====
All NICE Paratransit buses are 26 ft (7.9 m) long and use diesel fuel.

Image	Type	Model year	Numbers (Total)	Approximate Amount active
	Ford Transit; Impala, Transit, E350, E450 HD minibuses	2016-2021	2298-2365; 2371-2398 (91 buses)	89
	Ford Transit; E450 HD minibus	2019	2366-2370 (5 buses)	5
	Ford Transit; F450 minibus	2023-2024	2399-2438 (39 buses)	39
	Ford Transit minibus	2026	2447 ( unknown amount of buses)	1

== Routes and service area ==
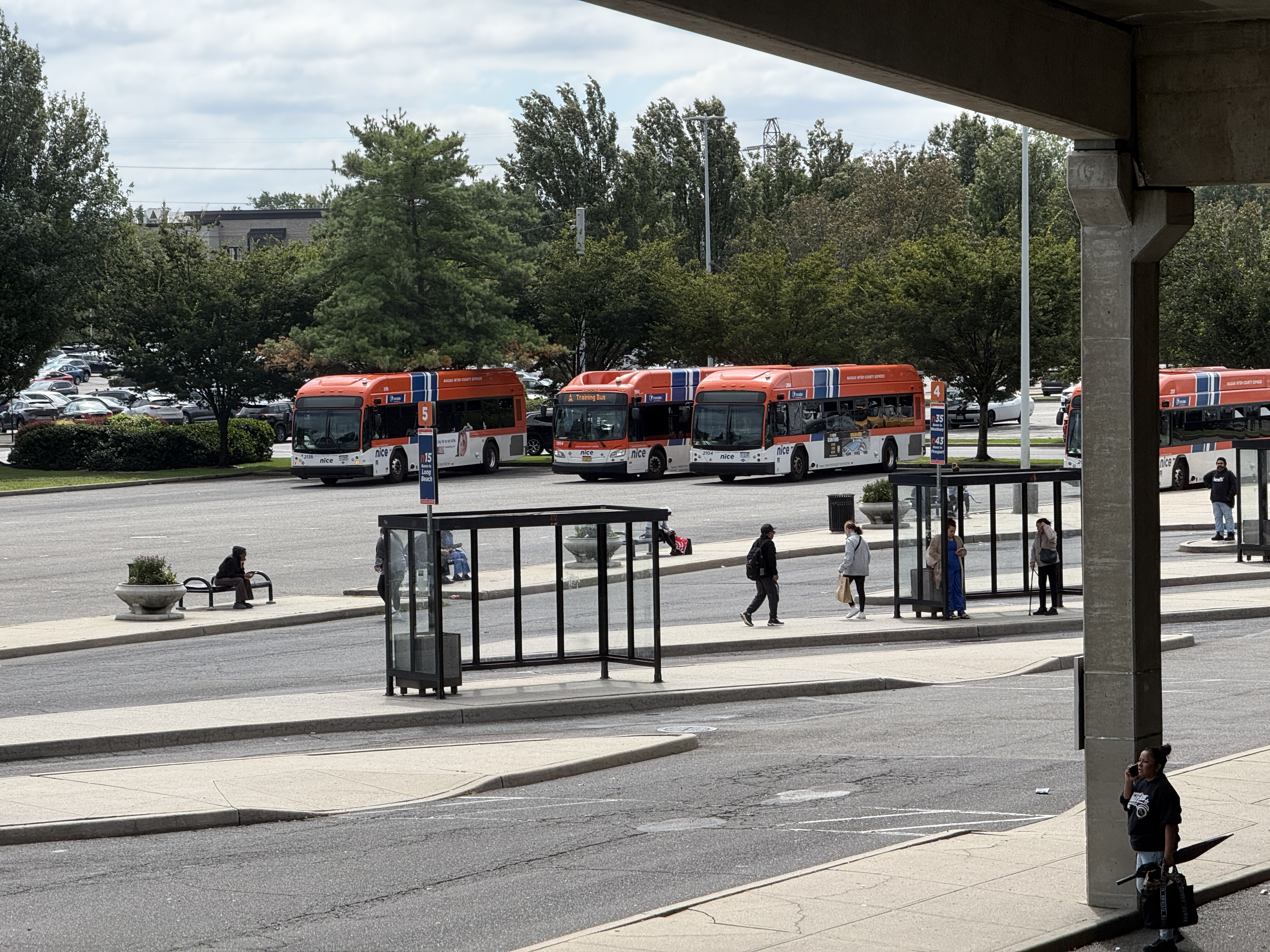
NICE buses at the Roosevelt Field Mall Bus Terminal, a major transfer point

NICE runs fixed-route service on 41 routes, plus three shuttles, serving the towns of Hempstead, North Hempstead, and the southern part of Oyster Bay, along with parts of the cities of Long Beach and Glen Cove. Non-shuttle routes are designated with a lowercase "n" for Nassau County, a numbering system instituted by NICE's predecessor MTA Long Island Bus. 24-hour service is provided on the n40/41 (Mineola–Freeport), n4 (Merrick Road), and n6 (Hempstead Turnpike) routes.

Most NICE routes operating to Jamaica and Flushing in Queens provide service only for passengers riding to and from Nassau County. Similarly, NICE routes operating in Long Beach require all passengers to board or exit the bus outside the city of Long Beach, with local service provided by Long Beach Bus.

== See also ==
- Transportation on Long Island
- Suffolk County Transit - the bus system in Suffolk County, to the immediate east.
- MTA New York City Bus - the bus system in New York City, to the immediate west.
- Long Beach Bus - the bus system in the City of Long Beach in southern Nassau County.
- Huntington Area Rapid Transit - the bus system in the Town of Huntington in northwestern Suffolk County.
