= XBI =

XBI or xbi may refer to:

- X-ray birefringence imaging, the X‑ray analogue of the polarizing optical microscope
- xbi, the ISO 639-3 code for Kombio language, Papua New Guinea
