= B10 cell =

B10 cells are a sub-class of regulatory B cells (B_{reg} cell) that are involved in inhibiting immune responses in both humans and mice. B10 cells are named for their ability to produce inhibitory interleukin: Interleukin-10 (IL-10). One of their unique abilities is that they suppress the innate and adaptive immune signals, making them important for regulating the inflammatory response. Like the B cell, the B10 cell requires antigen specific binding to the surface of CD5 receptor to elicit a response from the T cell. Once an antigen binds to the CD19 receptor, immediate downregulation in B-cell receptor (BCR) signal expression occurs and mediates the release of IL-10 cytokines. In mice and humans, B10 cells are distinguishable in their expression of measurable IL-10 due to the lack of unique cell surface markers expressed by regulatory B cells. However, IL-10 competence is not limited to any one subset of B cells. B10 cells do not possess unique phenotypic markers or transcription factors for further identification. B10 cells predominantly localize in the spleen, though they are also found in the blood, lymph nodes, Peyer's patches, intestinal tissues, central nervous system, and peritoneal cavity. B10 cells proliferate during inflammatory and disease responses.

== History ==
Sauropsida divergence was coincident with the emergence of B10. B10 markers have been expressed since this divergence event, including CD19, CD1d, IL-21, and CD5 markers. CD24, a human B10 marker, is exclusive to higher vertebrates and is absent in Vombatus and the organisms that diverged prior.

The B10 cell was first characterized in 2008, as a different subset of B cells in mice. By inducing hypersensitive T cells, the immune response of the mice was over-expressed. When compared to the wild type or normal expression of antigen receptors, the B cells bound to CD19 molecules actually decreased inflammation. The in vivo model demonstrated that a new characterization of B cell was producing IL-10 which was later defined as the B10 effector (B10eff) cells.

== Development and differentiation ==
B10 cells are presumed to originate from B10 progenitor (B10pro) cells, which can mature into B10eff cells with lipopolysaccharide (LPS) stimulation or CD40 litigation. In mice, B10eff cells (derived from B10 cells) actively secrete IL-10, whereas competency for IL-10 expression in B10pro cells must be induced by ex vivo stimulation. BCR signals are fundamental to the development of B10pro cells which can develop into B10eff cells in the presence of CD40 signals, LPS, or IL-21. Some B10eff cells further develop into Ab-secreting plasma cells. B10 cell development is antigen (Ag)-regulated through BCR signaling pathways which select for Ag-specific B10 cells and stimulate IL-10 competency. In vitro identification of IL-10-competent cells can occur by stimulation of B cells using PMA and ionomycin.

Within the spleen of C57B1/6 mice, B10 cells comprise 1-3% (and B10+B10pro cells comprise 3-8%) of B cells. B10pro cell numbers are comparatively more consistent than B10 cells during immune responses. The general phenotype of B10 splenic cells is IgM^{hi} IgD^{lo} CD19^{hi} MHC-II^{hi} CD21^{int/hi} CD23^{lo} CD24^{hi} CD43^{+/-} CD93^{−}. Characteristics of this phenotype are similar to immature transitional B cells, marginal zone B cells, and peritoneal B1 cells. Peritoneal B10 cells share a similar phenotype but express lower levels of CD1d. Mouse B10 cells in the spleen are enriched in the B cell subset CD1d^{hi}CD5^{+}, whereas human B10 and B10pro peripheral blood cells are enriched in the B cell subset CD24^{hi}CD27^{+}.

== Function ==
BCR-antigen interactions and BCR signaling facilitate antigen specificity and reactivity of B10 cells. B10 cell germline BCRs interact with and present antigens to respective CD4^{+} T cells. These cognate interactions are dependent on MHC-II and CD40, and encourage IL-10 production and enable B10 cells to suppress macrophage function. While cognate CD4^{+} T cell and B10 cell interactions are critical for B10eff cell functioning, T cells are not. The anti-inflammatory cytokine IL-10 suppresses innate and adaptive immune signals by prohibiting T cell activation, in addition to IFN-γ and Th17 cytokine responses. Another cytokine, IL-21, regulates B10eff cell functionality in its integral role to the expansion of B10 cells and secretion of B10eff cells in autoimmune responses.

By a similar regulatory mechanism, the development of B10pro cells is inhibited by TGF-β and IFN-γ. Through their inhibitory effects, B10 cells interfere with antigen-presenting abilities, the production of cytokines, and the activation of dendritic cells. In addition, their secretion of IL-10 can interfere with the phagocytosis, the activation of macrophages, and the production of cytokines and nitric oxide (NO). IL-10 production is regulated, as is the functioning of local macrophages and Ag-specific T cells. By this specificity, IL-10 is delivered to sites of inflammatory and immune response. CpG oligonucleotides promote IL-10 production in competent B10 cells. Similarly, innate signals such as IL-1β, IL-6, IL-33, IL-35, TLR signals, infection, and apoptotic cells may proliferate B10 and B10eff cells. In the peripheral blood of patients with autoimmune diseases, B10 cell numbers are typically expanded.

== Therapeutic potential ==
B10 cells have been studied in mouse models on account of their therapeutic relevance to autoimmune disease. In mouse models, the introduction of additional B10 cells during disease onset can mitigate and accelerate disease-related symptoms and progression. Purified B10 cells of subsets including CD1d^{hi}CD5^{+} B cells and peritoneal cavity B cells demonstrate suppressive effects for Ag-specific responses especially. Therapeutic potential for B10 cells was first revealed by the Londei laboratory through induced B cell-expression of IL-10, then later by studies using B10eff cell expansion, both instances of which demonstrated therapeutic effects in the context of disease initiation and progression. Autoimmune disease and cancer treatments are possible through either the preferential expansion or depletion of B10 cells.

Disease progression in patients with autoimmune diseases such as lupus or rheumatoid arthritis can commence with insufficient B10 cell numbers. Moreover, B10 cell expansion in the absence of autoimmune-related production of inflammatory cytokine factors provides potential for immune response, allergy, and transplant rejection treatment. Agonistic CD40 antibodies enable in vivo B10 cell expansion, though unwanted responses from additional immune cells may transpire. Ex vivo B10 cell expansion is also possible, though this method is limited in expansion methods, magnitude, and time. Induced B10 cell expansion in esophageal squamous cell carcinoma (ESCC) patients and subsequent elevated IL-10 production support the role of B10 cells in regulating disease progression, specifically through restrained inflammatory responses. As such, in adequate quantities, B10 cells can both regulate and treat diseases.

B10 cells are prevalent in the human solid tumor and peritumoral tissues of several cancers, including lung, hepatocellular carcinoma, and breast cancers. Their ability to promote cancer growth is attributed to immunosuppression mechanisms through innate and adaptive immune responses. B10 cell depletion can amplify cellular, innate, and humoral immune system responses and might aid in immune responses to cancer therapy, infectious diseases, and vaccines. The depletion of B10 cells enables a more rapid immune response and can improve pathogen clearance. Further, inhibited B10 cell functioning can improve anticancer responses. The preferential depletion of B10 cells provides therapeutic potential for enhanced anticancer responses due to the intrinsic ability of B10 cells to impede antitumor immune responses.
