= 10B =

10B or X-B may refer to:

- Oflag X-B, a World War II German POW camp for officers located near Nienburg am Weser
- Stalag X-B, a World War II German Prisoner-of-war camp located near Sandbostel
- A Mazda Wankel engine model
- Boron-10 (^{10}B), an isotope of boron

== See also ==
- B10 (disambiguation)
- XB (disambiguation)
- 10 (disambiguation)
- B (disambiguation)
