= Transportation on Long Island =

Nearly every major type of transportation serves Long Island, including three major airports, railroads and subways, and several major highways. The New York City Subway only serves the New York City boroughs of Brooklyn and Queens. There are historic and modern bridges, recreational and commuter trails, and ferries, that connect the boroughs of Queens and Brooklyn to Manhattan, the south shore with Fire Island and Long Island's north shore and east end with the state of Connecticut.

== Air ==
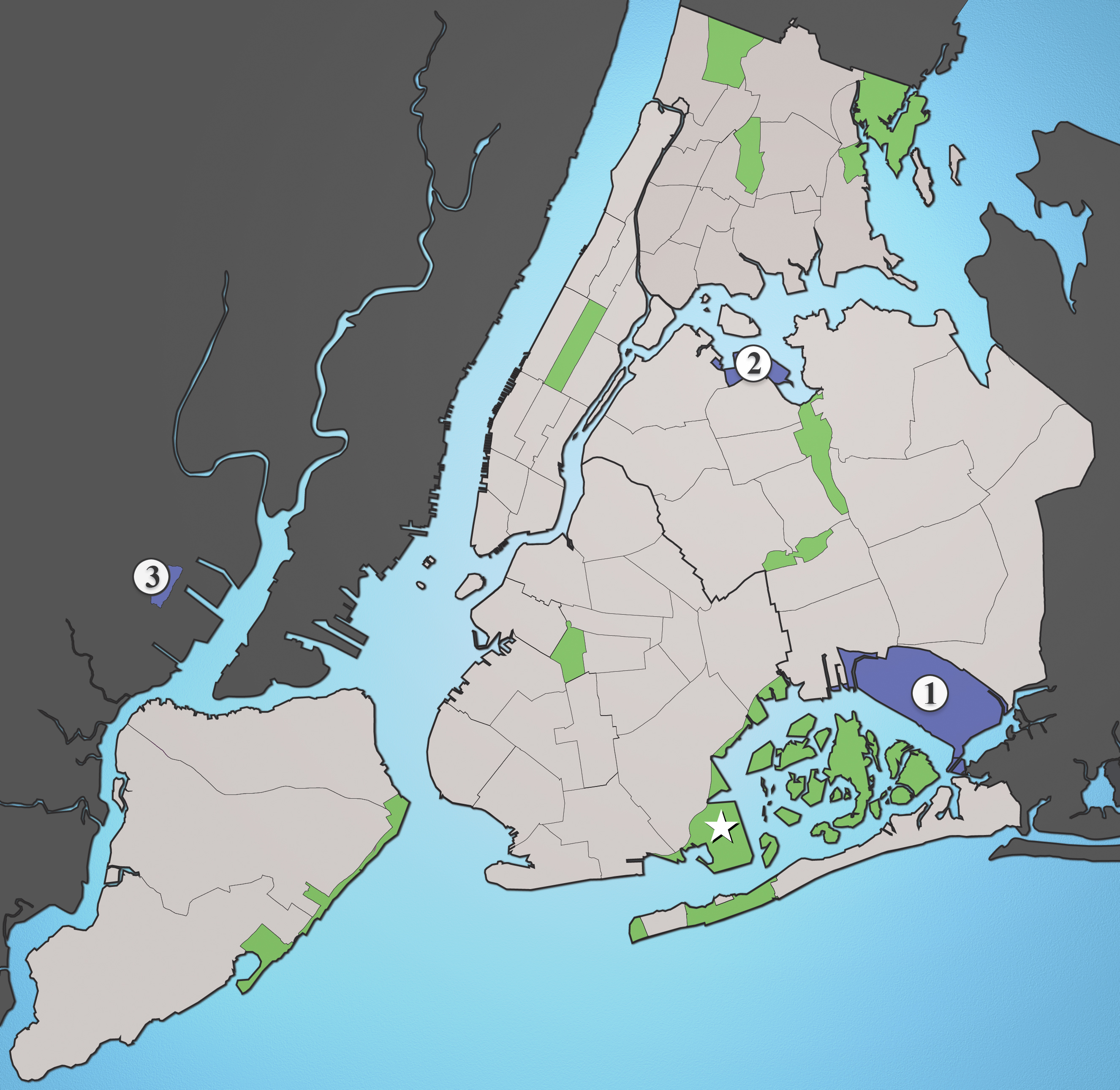
Map showing JFK (1) and LaGuardia (2) airports, both in Queens

Long Island is the location of three large airports with regularly scheduled commercial jet airline service. These are the John F. Kennedy International Airport and LaGuardia Airport, both in Queens County (in New York City), and the Long Island MacArthur Airport, (sometimes referred to as the "Islip Airport"), a smaller airport in Suffolk County. MacArthur is the only airport in Nassau or Suffolk counties with regularly scheduled commercial flights, handling about 2 million passengers a year. There are also general aviation airports on Long Island, such as Brookhaven Airport, East Hampton Airport, Francis S. Gabreski Airport, Montauk Airport, and Republic Airport as well as the grass strip equipped Bayport Aerodrome.

Travelers heading to or from Kennedy Airport may use AirTrain to connect with the Long Island Rail Road in Jamaica or the New York City Subway in Jamaica or Howard Beach.

== Roads ==
The Long Island Expressway, Northern State Parkway, and Southern State Parkway, all products of the automobile-centered planning of Robert Moses, make east–west travel on the island straightforward, if not always quick. Indeed, locals refer to Long Island Expressway as "The World's Longest Parking Lot".

**Major roads of Long Island**
**West–East Roads** Ocean Parkway Merrick Road / Montauk Highway **Sunrise Highway*** **Belt Parkway** / **Southern State Parkway** Hempstead Turnpike **Grand Central Parkway** / **Northern State Parkway** **Long Island Expressway** Jericho Turnpike/Middle Country Road Northern Boulevard	**North–South Roads** **Brooklyn-Queens Expressway** **Van Wyck Expressway** **Cross Island Parkway** **Meadowbrook State Parkway** **Wantagh State Parkway** Newbridge Road/Broadway Cedar Swamp Road/Broadway **Seaford-Oyster Bay Expressway** Broad Hollow Road/New York Avenue Deer Park Avenue **Robert Moses Causeway** **Sagtikos State Parkway** / **Sunken Meadow State Parkway** Islip Avenue Nicolls Road **William Floyd Parkway**
Roads in **boldface** are limited access roads. • *Sunrise Highway is only limited-access from western Suffolk county eastwards.

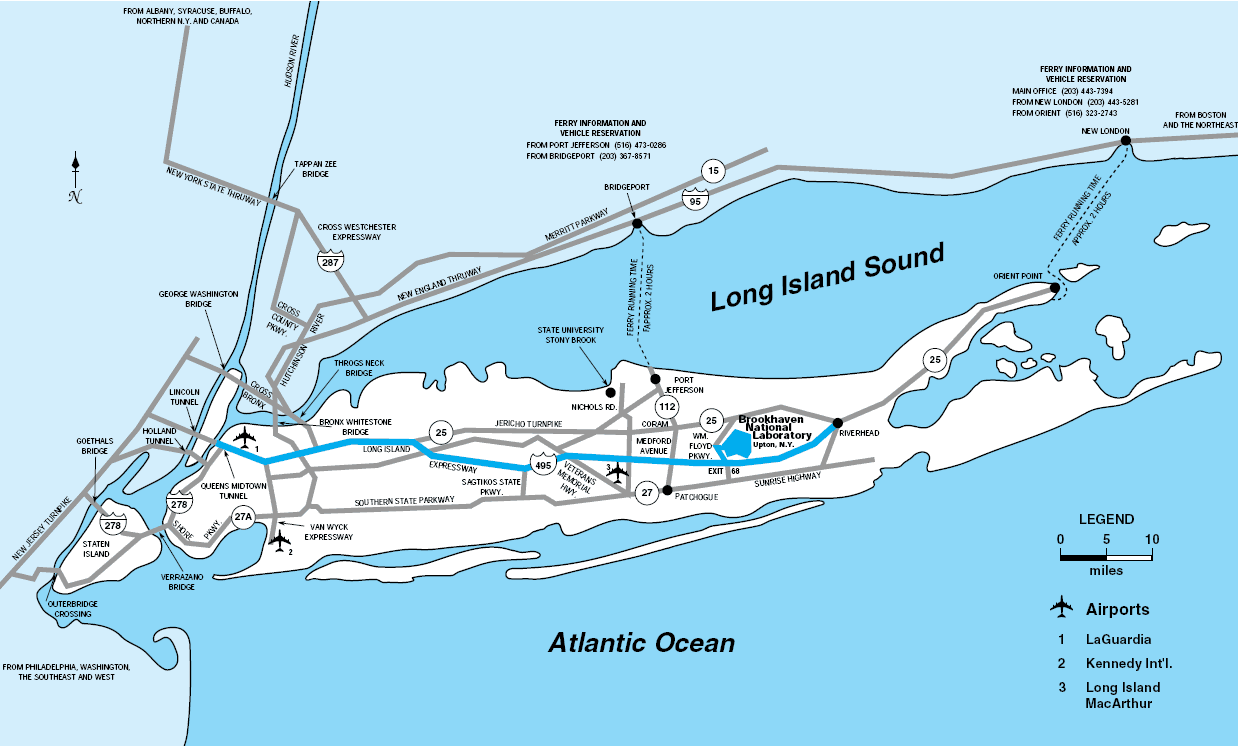
Road map of Long Island

=== Bridges and tunnels ===
Until the completion of the Brooklyn Bridge in 1883, all travel to Long Island was by boat. The first trains to connect Long Island to Manhattan were elevated rail lines that travelled over that same bridge. The 7 train was the first and is the most notable of these elevated subway lines. There are currently ten road crossings out of Long Island: the Verrazzano–Narrows Bridge to Staten Island; the Brooklyn Battery Tunnel, Brooklyn Bridge, Manhattan Bridge, Williamsburg Bridge, Queens Midtown Tunnel, and Queensboro Bridge to Manhattan; the Triborough Bridge to either Manhattan or the Bronx via Wards Island; and the Whitestone Bridge and Throgs Neck Bridge to the Bronx.

All ten crossings are within New York City limits at the extreme western end of the island, making trips from Long Island to New England especially circuitous. Plans for a Long Island Sound crossing at various locations in Nassau and Suffolk Counties have been discussed for decades, but there are currently no firm plans to construct such a crossing.

In addition to the vehicular tunnels, there are eleven subway and railroad tunnels in Brooklyn and Queens crossing the East River. The most notable of these are the Northeast Corridor's East River Tunnels used by Amtrak and the Long Island Rail Road to connect to Pennsylvania Station in Manhattan. In addition, the proposed Cross-Harbor Rail Tunnel would greatly expand Long Island's access to the national freight rail system.

=== Bus service ===
The Nassau Inter-County Express provides bus transportation throughout Nassau County and the western portions of Suffolk County. This service was until the end of 2011 provided by the MTA as MTA Long Island Bus. Long Beach Bus also provides service in Long Beach, Nassau County. Suffolk County Transit provides bus transportation throughout Suffolk County, except within the Town of Huntington, which is served by Huntington Area Rapid Transit.

All bus stops are in effect at all times unless otherwise indicated by signage.

Sign color	Type of service
**Blue**	Nassau Inter-County Express local bus stops in Queens (pickup only except in Far Rockaway, where there is pick-up and drop-off).
**Orange**	Pick-up and drop-off points within Nassau County.
**White**	Nassau Inter-County Express service in Nassau and Suffolk counties; Suffolk Transit service

Long Island Rail Road system map.

== Rail ==
The Long Island Rail Road is the second busiest commuter railroad system in North America, carrying in 2012 an average of 282,400 customers each weekday on 728 daily trains. It was once the largest commuter rail in the U.S. but following three successive years of declines was replaced at the close of 2012 by the Metro-North railroad that services areas north of New York City. Chartered on April 24, 1834, it is also the oldest railroad still operating under its original name. By the close of 2014, the LIRR commutation statistics had recovered to an average weekday ridership of 298,448 and an annual ridership of 85,868,246 achieved by December 31, 2014.

It is a publicly owned system, operated by the Metropolitan Transportation Authority, under the name MTA Long Island Rail Road.

== Ferries ==
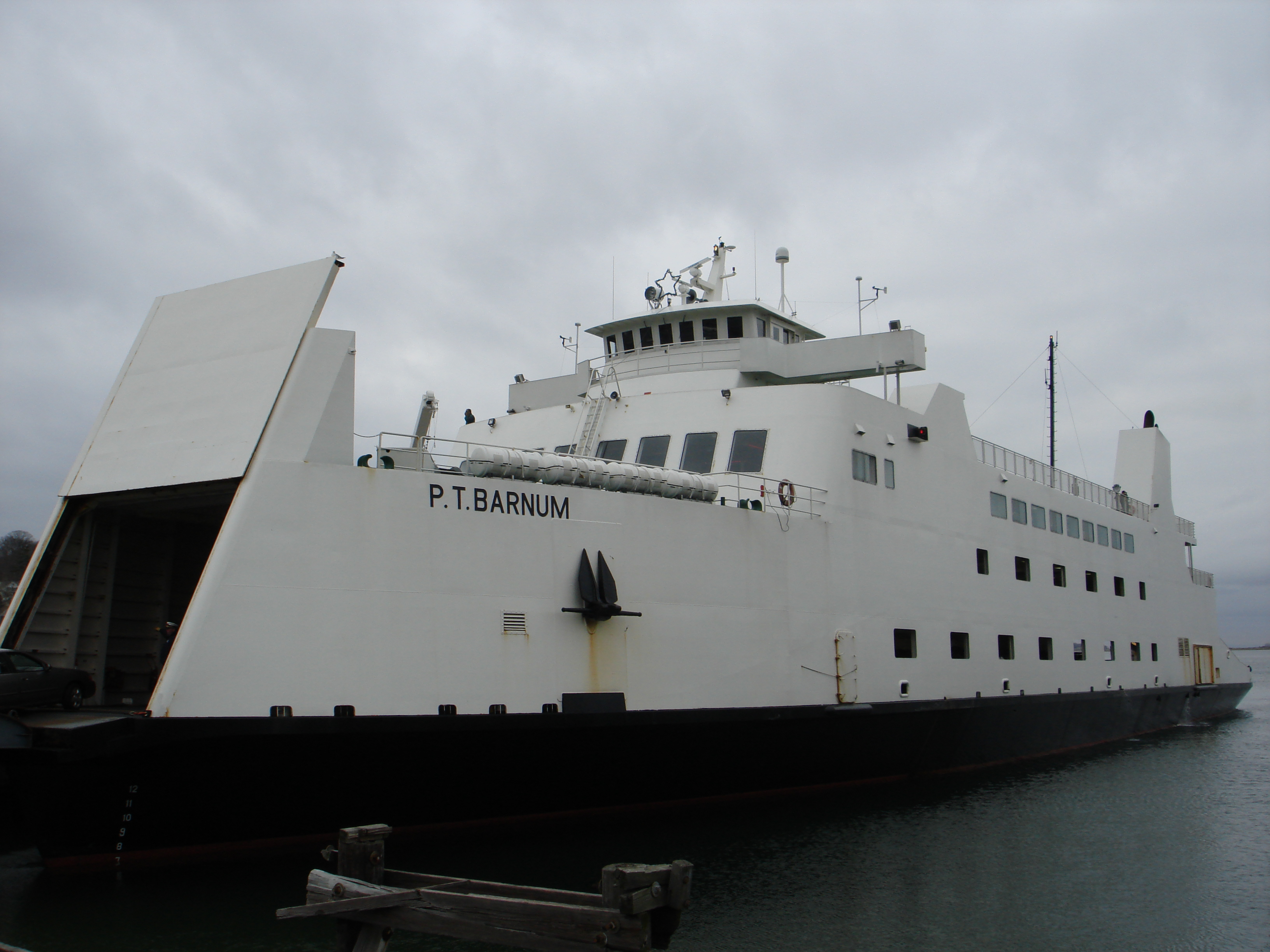
The MV P.T. Barnum docked at Port Jefferson

Ferries provide service between Long Island and Connecticut, notably the Bridgeport & Port Jefferson Ferry between Port Jefferson, New York and Bridgeport, Connecticut, and the Cross Sound Ferry between Orient Point, New York and New London, Connecticut. Some of the ferries that cross Long Island Sound carry automobiles, trucks and buses, as well as passengers.

There are also the two ferries which serve Shelter Island (see New York State Route 114), a summer-only ferry between Block Island and Montauk, and a number of ferries serving Fire Island.

In February 2015, Mayor Bill de Blasio announced that the city government would begin NYC Ferry to extend ferry transportation to traditionally underserved communities in the city. The ferry opened in May 2017, with the Queens neighborhoods of Rockaway and Astoria served by their eponymous routes. A third route, the East River Ferry, serves various points in western Brooklyn as well as Hunter's Point South, Queens. A fourth route, the South Brooklyn route, serves South Brooklyn, Sunset Park, and Bay Ridge in Brooklyn. (For a more detailed list of ferries that connect the west end of Long Island, in the boroughs of Brooklyn and Queens, to Manhattan see the List of ferries across the East River.)

Additionally, there are several water taxi services.
