= Interleukin 35 =

Protein involved in immune suppression

Interleukin 35 (IL-35) is an anti-inflammatory cytokine from the IL-12 family largely produced by regulatory T and B cells (T_{regs} and B_{regs} respectively). IL-35 can block the development of Th1 and Th17 cells by limiting early T cell proliferation and has been shown to play a role in immune suppression.

== Discovery ==
IL-35 was discovered following the isolation of IL-12 from Epstein-Barr virus-transformed B-lymphoblastoid cells. Shortly following the discovery of IL-12, a protein known as Epstein-Barr virus-induced gene 3 (EBI3) was identified. EBI3 is a known homologue to IL-12 p40 (a key IL-12 subunit) and to the ciliary neurotrophic factor receptor, whose expression is induced in B lymphoblastoid cells by Epstein-Barr Virus (EBV) infection.

Following these discoveries, attempts were made to identify potential pairing partners for EBI3. IL-12a, otherwise known as IL-12p35, was identified to associate with EBI3 in solution and form a heterodimer that was later named IL-35. Later studies to elucidate the function of the IL-35 heterodimer showed that it is naturally produced by activated T_{regs} and B_{regs} with various implications in immune modulation.

== Function ==
=== Expression ===
Secreted by T_{regs}, B_{regs}, and CD8+ T_{regs,} IL-35 suppresses inflammatory responses of immune cells. While not expressed constitutively in tissues, the gene that encodes IL-35 is transcribed by smooth muscle cells, vascular endothelial cells, and monocytes activated by inflammatory stimuli. IL-35 has selective activities on different T-cell subsets; it induces proliferation of T_{reg} cell populations but reduces activity of T_{h}17 cell populations.

== Structure and Signaling ==
=== IL-35 and its receptor ===
Like other IL-12 cytokine family members, IL-35 exists as a heterodimer. More specifically, IL-35 is composed of IL-12α (also known as IL-12 p35) and IL-27β (also known as EBI3) chains. These protein chains are encoded by two separate genes called IL12A and EBI3 (Epstein-Barr virus-induced gene 3), respectively.

The optimal IL-35 receptor in T cells is also heterodimeric in nature and consists of IL-12Rβ2 (part of the IL-12R) and gp130 (part of IL-27R) chains. Homodimers of both IL-12Rβ2 and gp130 also exist and are capable of initiating IL-35 signaling in T cells. However, these homodimers are less efficient at initiating a cellular response to IL-35 than the aforementioned heterodimer. The heterodimeric IL-35 receptor is also necessary for the upregulation of both the IL-12a and EBI3 proteins in T cells.

The most prevalent IL-35 receptor on B cells is composed of IL-12Rβ2 and IL-27Rα (otherwise known as WSX-1).

=== IL-35 signaling Pathway ===
Both hetero- and homodimeric T cell IL-35 receptors cause intracellular signaling via the JAK-STAT pathway (Janus kinase/signal transducers and activators of transcription) upon IL-35 binding. However, the intracellular signaling mechanisms between the two dimer types are slightly different. Following IL-35 binding to the IL-12Rβ2 and gp130 heterodimeric receptor, a STAT1/STAT4 complex is activated in T cells expressing CD4. Homodimer signaling, on the other hand, occurs through activation of only STAT4 by IL-12Rβ2 homodimers and only STAT1 by gp130 homodimers.

The IL-12Rβ2/IL-27Rα heterodimer most prevalent in B cells also signals via JAK-STAT pathways; it is capable of activating STAT1 and STAT3.

== Roles in disease ==
=== Autoimmune conditions ===
The role of IL-35 in autoimmune conditions is well documented, with multiple studies pointing at IL-35 having diverse protective roles against autoimmune conditions including Type 1 diabetes, immuno-related hemocytopenia, systemic lupus erythematosus, and many others. Patterns such as lowered serum IL-35 have been noted across some of the aforementioned autoimmune conditions, with symptoms showing decreased severity following treatment with exogenous IL-35. Additionally, while knockout of IL-35 does not lead to immediate development of autoimmunity at high levels, mice deficient in IL-35 have been shown to develop worsened autoimmune responses relative to controls when challenged.

Both cell cultures and experimental models of inflammatory bowel disease have shown that the absence of either IL-35 chain from T_{regs} reduces the cells' ability to suppress inflammation. A group of scientists established a CIA (collagen-induced arthritis) mouse model to show suppressive effects of IL-35. Intraperitoneal injection of IL-35 in the tested subjects lowered expression of several factors linked to this disease (such as VEGF and its receptors, TNF-α). The effect of IL-35 in this case seems to be on the STAT1 signalling pathway.

In patients with T1D (type 1 diabetes), plasma levels of IL-35 are lower than in healthy individuals. IL-35 production by T_{regs} is decreased in mouse models of T1D, and administration of IL-35 prevents the development of experimental T1D and reverses established experimental T1D. In T1D patients with remaining C-peptide, IL-35 production by T_{regs} and _{Bregs} is much higher than T1D patients with no remaining C-peptide.

In multiple sclerosis, no significant differences in mean serum levels of IL-35 have been found between healthy and diseased patients at baseline. Despite this, patients who received methylprednisolone and/or IFN-β (known treatments of multiple sclerosis) have shown significantly higher IL-35 serum levels than even healthy patients. Additionally, experimental autoimmune encephalomyelitis (EAE; a mouse model of multiple sclerosis) has shown that B cells are capable of ameliorating progression of the condition through production of IL-35.

In cases of immuno-related hemocytopenia (IRH), serum IL-35 levels have been shown to be significantly lower in untreated patients than in treated individuals. Additionally, levels of IL-35 production in cases of the autoimmune disorder appear to be correlated significantly with the disease severity. This decrease in IL-35 levels appears to be associated with decreased T_{reg} expression in patients with IRH relative to healthy levels.

Decreases in serum IL-35 have also been found to occur in cases of systemic lupus erythematosus (SLE). Individuals experiencing active SLE show not only decreased serum IL-35, but additionally exhibit a decrease in their CD4/EBI3-positive T cells relative to healthy individuals and individuals with inactive SLE. As in the case of multiple sclerosis, methylprednisolone treatment has been shown experimentally to improve the serum IL-35 levels in cases of systemic lupus erythematosus, and additionally resulted in the increase in CD4/EBI3-positive T cells in a cohort of 10 patients with active SLE.

=== Bacterial diseases ===
Studies performed on mouse models of EAE have shown that mice lacking IL-35-producing B cells are unable to recover from T-cell mediated demyelination but are resistant to infection by pathogenic intracellular microbe Salmonella typhimurium.

=== Viral diseases ===
Evidence suggests that IL-35, through its suppression of inflammatory activity, could play a role in the progression of various viral infections. More specifically, there is growing evidence that IL-35 could play a role in viruses including but not limited to hepatitis B and C evading immune regulation through the cytokine's suppression of key pro-inflammatory responses.

It has been shown that IL-35 increases replication of hepatitis B virus (HBV) both in vitro and in transgenic mice by targeting the transcription factor HNF4α. Targeting of the HNF4α transcription factor leads to higher levels of Hepatitis B e antigen, HBV core protein, and HBV mRNA. Clinical studies have shown that IL-35 is additionally involved in the upregulation of anti-inflammatory IL-10 and IL-35 in T_{regs} in cases of HBV infection. IL-35 additionally plays key roles in the development of tolerance in chronic cases of HBV infection, through suppressing the expression of pro-inflammatory cytokines in response to viral replication.

Similar relationships are seen between hepatitis C virus (HCV) and IL-35. Clinical studies have shown that chronically HCV-infected patients exhibit higher levels of IL-35 expression than healthy control individuals, and additionally see upregulation in the amount of T_{regs}. IL-35 additionally plays key roles in the upregulation of IL-10 and IL-35 in HCV infection, as is reported to occur for HBV infection. Studies suggest that in chronic HCV, the anti-inflammatory role of IL-35 could prolong infection through causing a downregulation of pro-inflammatory immune activity capable of reducing HCV proliferation.

In cases of Influenza A infection, IL-35 levels in human sera have been experimentally shown to become elevated relative to healthy baseline amounts.

Tumors

Given its suppressive function, IL-35 is also involved in tumor progression and tumor immune surveillance. Elevated circulating IL-35 levels have been found in several human tumors such as acute myeloid leukemia, pancreatic ductal adenocarcinoma and colorectal cancer.

Moreover, Forkhead box protein 3 (Foxp3) as a transcription factor is an essential molecular marker of T_{regs}. Foxp3 polymorphism (rs3761548) might be involved in cancer progression like gastric cancer through influencing T_{reg} function and the secretion of immunomodulatory cytokines such as IL-10, IL-35, and TGF-β.
