= XB =

XB, Xb, xB or xb may refer to:

- XB Browser, a web browser
- Scion xB, an automobile made by Toyota for the United States
- Xbox (console), a video game console produced by Microsoft Corporation
- Exchangeable bond, a type of security (financial asset)
- 1973 Ford Falcon XB, a variant of the Australian Ford Falcon automobile
  - Pursuit Special, a fictional model of car in the films Mad Max and Mad Max 2: The Road Warrior
- XB, the Aircraft Registration Prefix for Mexican Private Aircraft
- XB, United States aircraft designator for Experimental Bomber
- xB, a species designation in the Star Trek universe; see List of Star Trek characters

== See also ==
- 10B (disambiguation)
- XBS (disambiguation)
