= Long Beach Bus =

Public transportation system in Greater Long Beach, New York

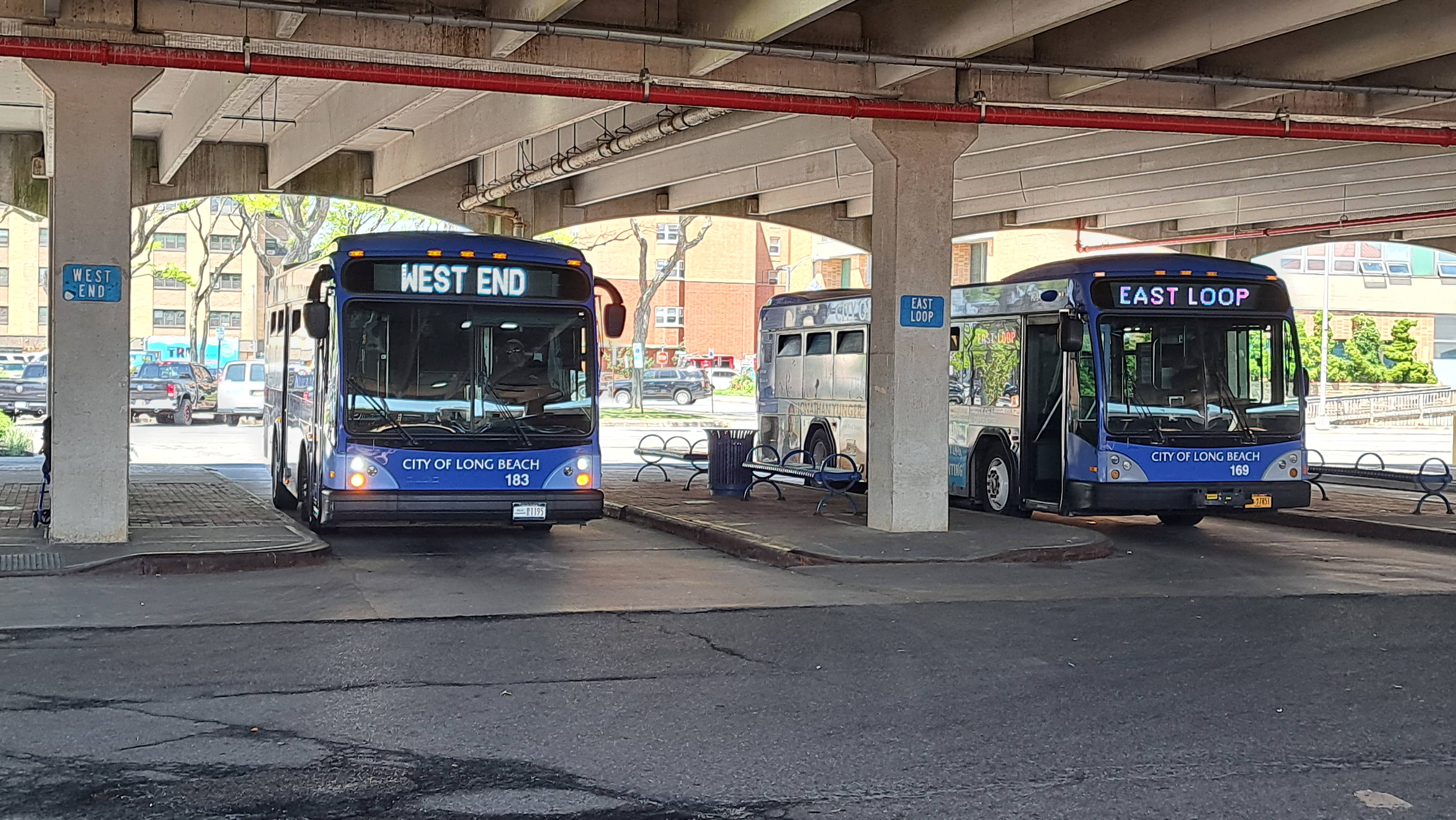
- 2015 Gillig BRT #169 and 2021 Gillig BRT #183 awaiting departure at Long Beach LIRR station
- Parent: City of Long Beach Department of Transportation
- Commenced operation: c. 1950
- Headquarters: 1 West Chester Street; Long Beach, New York 11561
- Locale: Southern Nassau County
- Service area: Long Beach, Lido Beach, and Point Lookout
- Service type: Local bus service
- Routes: 6
- Stops: ~70
- Hubs: Long Beach LIRR station
- Fleet: 10 (fixed route); 4 (paratransit) (2013 figures)
- Daily ridership: 1,469 (weekday); 827 (Saturday); 550 (Sunday)
- Operator: City of Long Beach Department of Transportation
- Chief executive: Brendan T. Costello
- Website: Long Beach Bus

Long Beach Bus is a public transportation system serving Greater Long Beach on the Long Beach Barrier Island of Long Island, New York. The service operates twenty-four hours a day, with six different routes connecting to one another and to Nassau Inter-County Express and Long Island Rail Road at Long Beach station in the city center.

Although Long Beach Bus is designed to complement county bus and commuter rail service, it is run independently by the Long Beach Department of Transportation.

== Service overview ==
The service operates 24-hours a day, except early Monday mornings. The service operates six routes, with two regular services within the city, one extended route to the Long Beach's eastern suburbs, two midday routes on weekdays, and one overnight circulator; tourist trolleys are used during the summer months. Viability of such an extensive service in a suburban setting is made possible by Long Beach's high-density layout: due to the limited supply of land on the island, fewer than 40% of homes are detached houses, making Long Beach one of the fifty densest cities in the country. The service also plays an important role in transporting the many tourists who arrive in the summer by train from New York City, and a tourist trolley route is operated during the summer months.

Because it is owned and operated independently by the City of Long Beach, and not by Nassau County, Long Beach Bus was unaffected by the 2012 privatization of Long Island Bus.

Most service information is provided bilingually in both English and American Spanish.

== History ==
Much of what now constitutes the Long Beach Bus network originally was operated privately. It was taken over by the City of Long Beach in the mid-20th century, following the 1947 bankruptcy of the Long Beach Bus Company and subsequent legal issues with the Beach Transit Corporation, which operated the system under a franchise for the city from 1947 until the early 1950s.

In 1973, the City of Long Beach considered possibly having the system taken over by the then-new Metropolitan Suburban Bus Authority. The plans were ultimately called off, with the system remaining in the city's control.

== Fare ==
The fare for all routes is $2.25, except for the Point Lookout service, which has a $2.75 base fare.

=== Long Beach Bus Pass ===
Bus passes, known as the Long Beach Bus Pass, are also available for purchase. The passes, introduced on October 1, 2022, come in two variants: 10-trip passes and 20-trip passes. The standard fare for a 10-trip pass is $22.50, while the standard fare for a 20-trip pass is $45.00.

== Bus routes ==
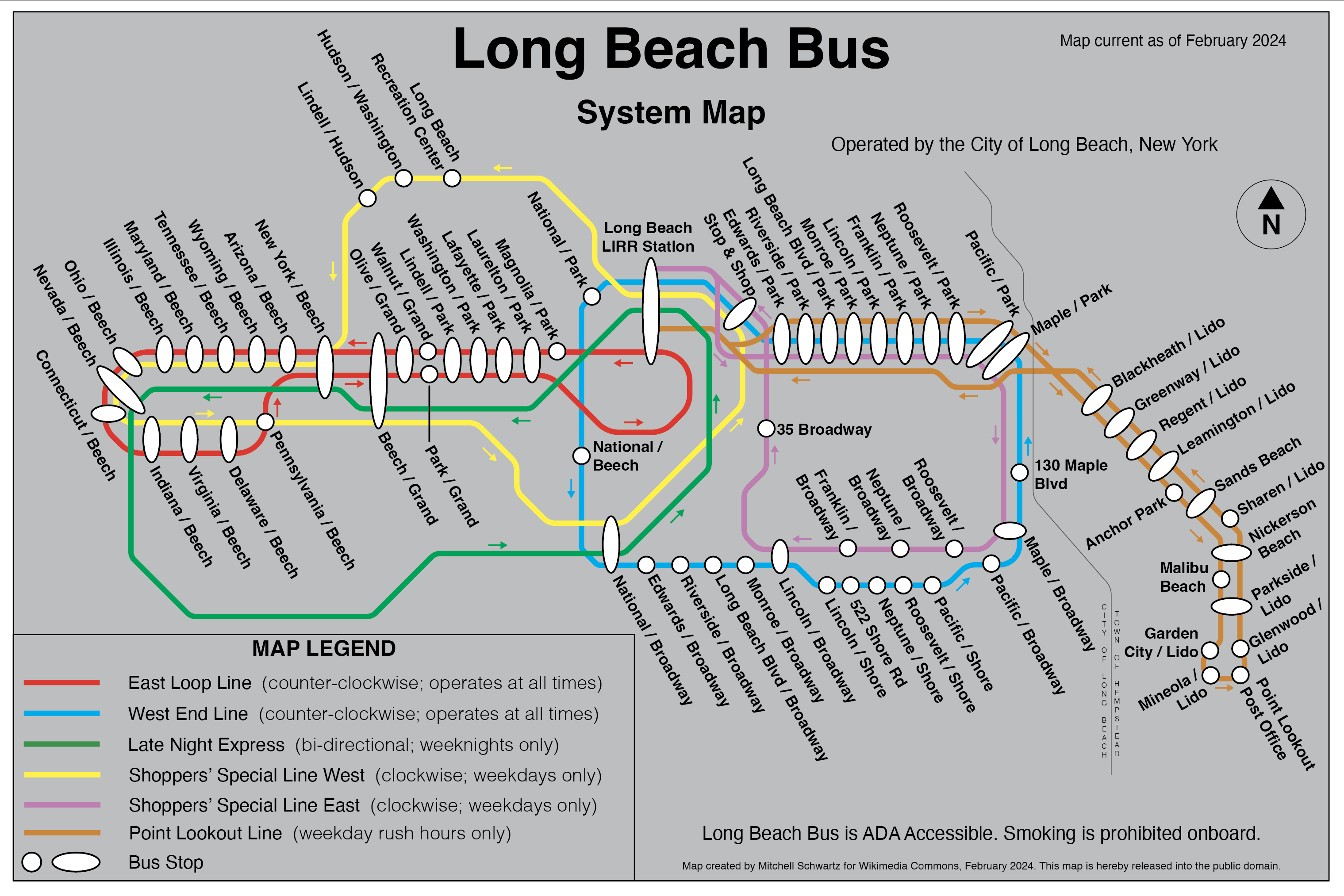
A map of the Long Beach Bus routes and select stations, as of 2024.

Long Beach Bus operates six bus routes within the City and to Lido Beach and Point Lookout, all originating from the system's hub: the bus terminal at the Long Beach station on the Long Island Rail Road's Long Beach Branch, adjacent to City Hall. The network consists of approximately 70 bus stops.

Route	Terminal	Major streets	History and notes
East Loop	Maple Boulevard and East Broadway	Edwards Boulevard; Broadway; Maple Boulevard; East Park Avenue	Counter-clockwise loop.
West End	West Beech Street and Nevada Avenue	West Park Avenue and West Beech Street	Counter-clockwise loop.
Shoppers' Special East	Maple Boulevard and East Broadway	East Park Avenue; Maple Boulevard; Broadway; Edwards Boulevard	Weekday middays only.; Clockwise loop. Reverse of East Loop route.
Shoppers' Special West	West Beech Street and Nevada Avenue	Edwards Boulevard; Broadway; Maple Boulevard; East Park Avenue	Weekday middays only.; Clockwise loop. Reverse of West End route.
Point Lookout Line	Point Lookout	Lido Boulevard; East Park Avenue	Branch Bus Corp at 1973 MSBA takeover; route transferred to Long Beach in 1984; Weekday rush hour service only.; No passengers carried within Long Beach on this route.; Formerly N69
Late Night Express	West End service first, then East Loop service	West Beech Street; Nevada Avenue; Edwards Boulevard; Broadway; Maple Boulevard; Park Avenue	Overnight service.; No late night Sunday/early Monday morning service.

=== Paratransit ===
In accordance with the Americans with Disabilities Act, paratransit service is offered by Long Beach Bus to those unable to utilize traditional buses.

== Fleet ==
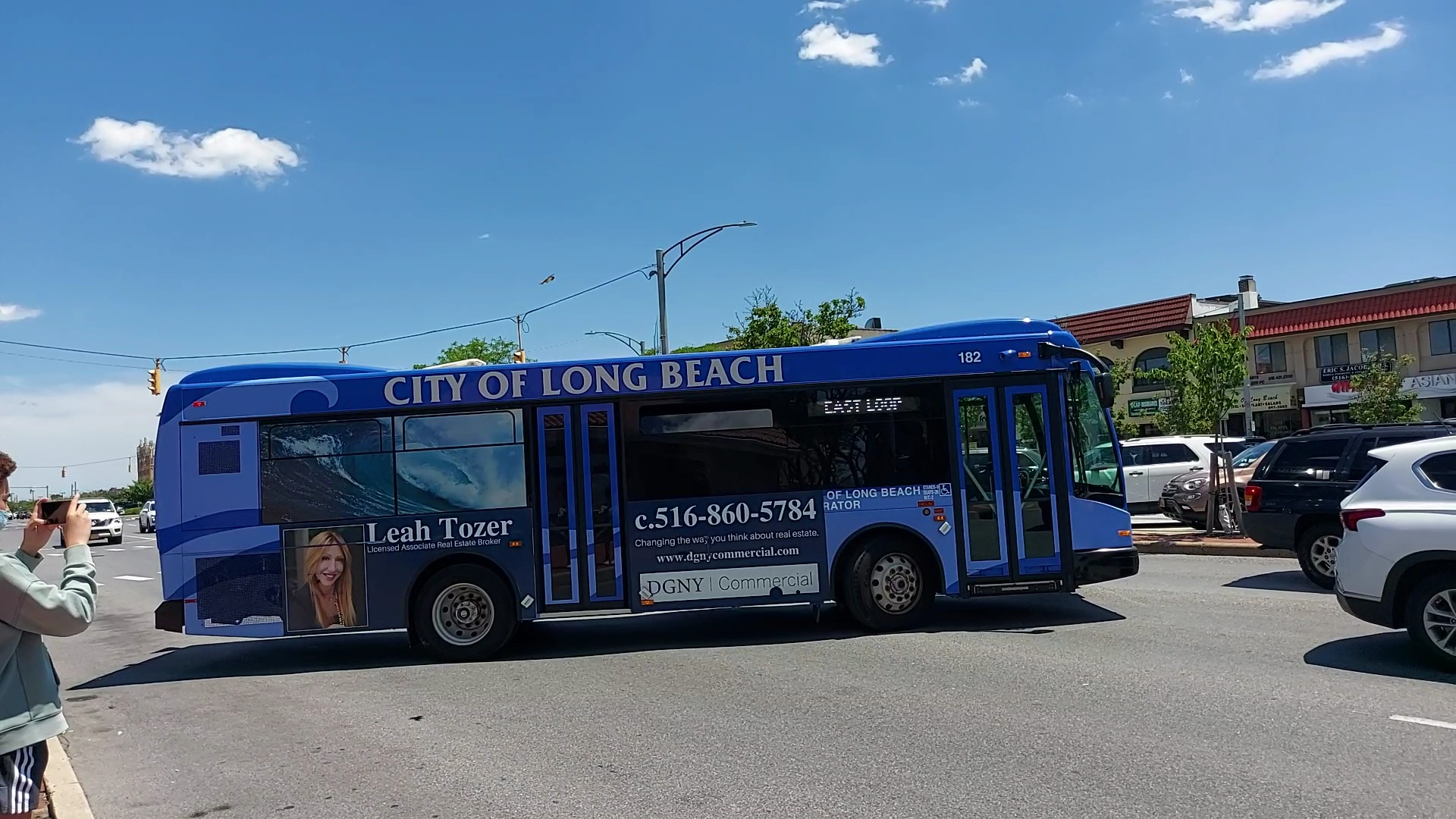
A Gillig BRT bus running on the East Loop route in 2021.

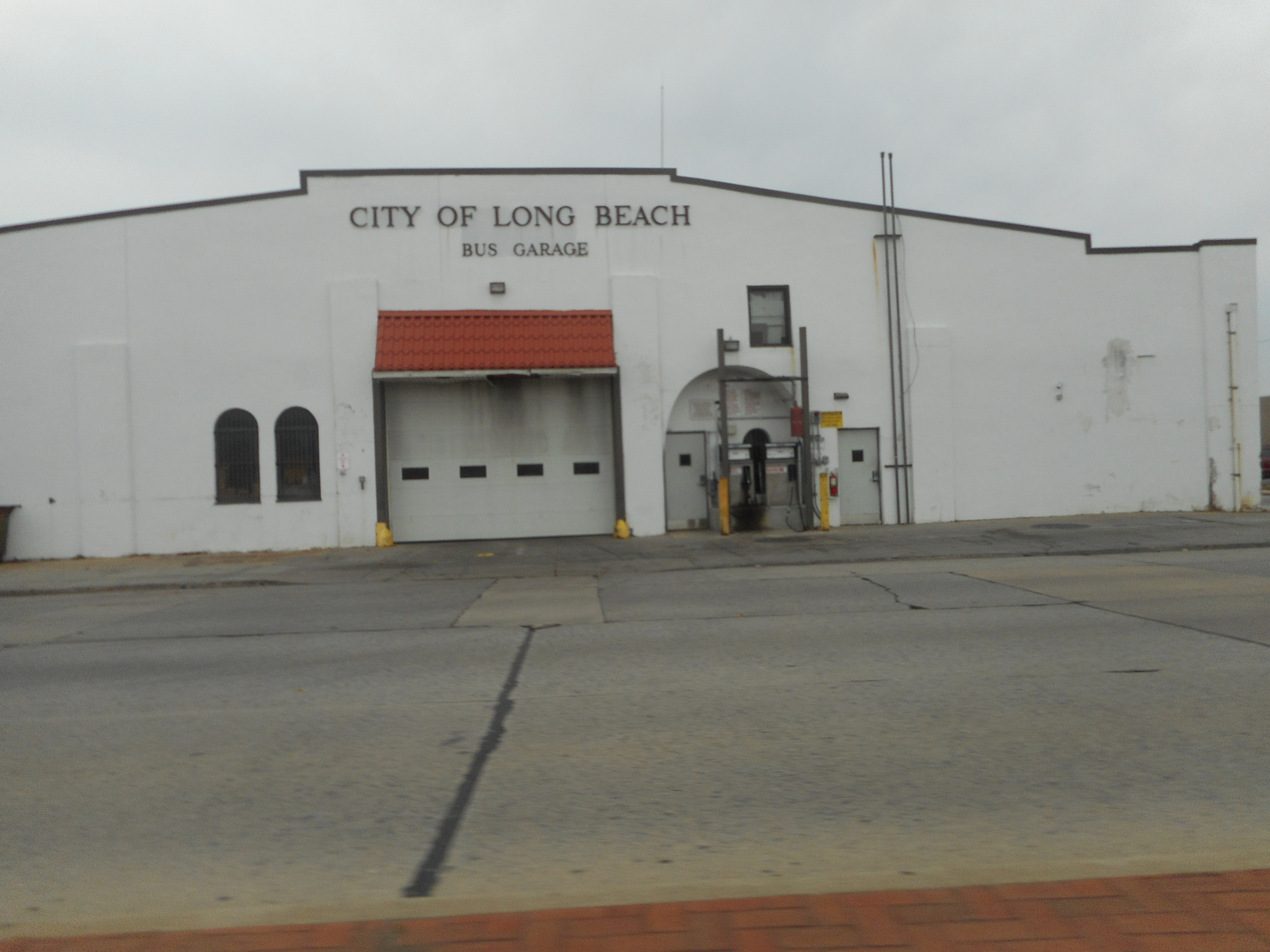
The bus garage on Long Beach Boulevard and East Pine Street.

Mainline bus service is operated using Gillig Advantage buses. These are supplemented by Gillig Trolley Replicas on the tourist trolley line and Ford E-Series-based paratransit vehicles.

All vehicles are wheelchair accessible. Mainline buses are equipped with bicycle racks and extensive bicycle parking is available at the bus terminal.

Long Beach Bus Fleet:
Fleet Number(s)	Photo	Build Date	Manufacturer	Model	Engines	Transmission
169		2012	Gillig	BRT 35'	Cummins ISL9	Allison B400R
170		2013	Gillig	BRT 35'	Cummins ISL9	Allison B400R
171-172		2014	Gillig	BRT 35'	Cummins ISL9	Allison B400R
179		2010	Gillig	Trolley Replica HEV 29'	Cummins ISL9	Allison E^{P}40 Hybrid System
180		2014	Freightliner Classic Trolley	XB-S California Street	Cummins ISB6.7	Allison 2200 PTS
181		2015	Gillig	Trolley Replica 29'	Cummins ISL9	Allison B300R
182-183		2021	Gillig	BRT 29'	Cummins L9	Allison B300R

== See also ==
- Transportation on Long Island
- Huntington Area Rapid Transit
