= X-ray birefringence imaging =

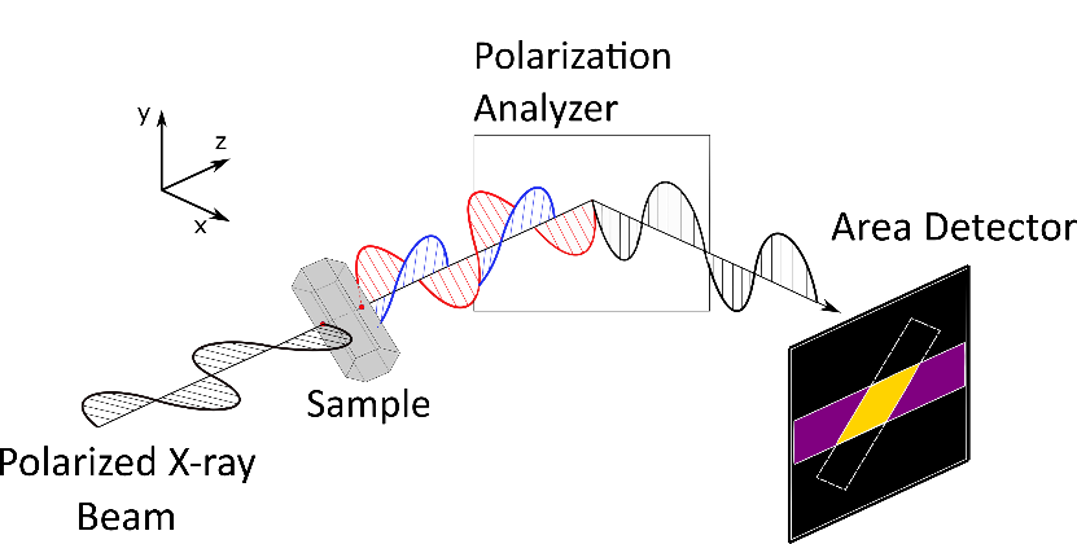
Shows how the X-ray polarization plane changes during an X-ray birefringence imaging experiment

X‑ray birefringence imaging (XBI) can be considered the X‑ray analogue of the polarizing optical microscope. XBI uses linearly polarized X-rays with an energy tuned to an elemental absorption edge. The tuned X-rays interact solely with the absorbing element, thus allowing the local anisotropy of the bonding environment of the X‑ray absorbing element to be studied. Due to the requirement of linearly polarized tunable X-rays a synchrotron source is necessary. Interaction with the bonding environment of the selected element in the sample changes the incident X-ray polarization plane. A polarization analyzer is used to diffract the rotated component of the polarization plane to an area detector. The greater the vertical component of the polarization plane the greater the intensity observed on the detector. In this way, it is possible to study the distribution of bond environments containing the X-ray absorbing element in a spatially resolved manner.

The XBI technique has been shown to be a sensitive method for spatially resolved mapping of the local orientational properties of anisotropic materials. In the case of organic materials, the technique may be applied to study the orientational properties of individual molecules and/or bonds (most applications of the technique so far have focused on studies of orientational ordering of C–Br bonds, from XBI measurements carried out using incident linearly polarized X-rays tuned to the bromine K-edge). Applications of the technique have included the study of changes in molecular orientations associated with order-disorder phase transitions in solids and characterization of phase transitions in liquid crystalline materials. XBI can also be exploited for spatially resolved analysis of orientationally distinct domains in materials, giving information the sizes of domains, the orientational relationships between domains, and the nature of domain boundaries.
