= XBL (disambiguation) =

XBL may refer to:

- Exploits Block List, a blacklist maintained by The Spamhaus Project
- The Exclusive Bus Lane in the Lincoln Tunnel
- Xbox Live, an online multiplayer gaming and digital media delivery service created and operated by Microsoft Corporation
- XML Binding Language, a markup language developed by the Mozilla project
