= GPR183 =

Protein-coding gene in the species Homo sapiens

Identifiers
- Aliases: GPR183, EBI2, G protein-coupled receptor 183, hEBI2
- External IDs: OMIM: 605741; MGI: 2442034; GeneCards: GPR183

Gene location (Human)
Chr.	Chromosome 13 (human)
Band	13q32.3	Start	99,294,539 bp
Band	13q32.3	End	99,307,399 bp

Gene location (Mouse)
Chr.	Chromosome 14 (mouse)
Band	14|14 E5	Start	122,189,963 bp
Band	14|14 E5	End	122,202,607 bp
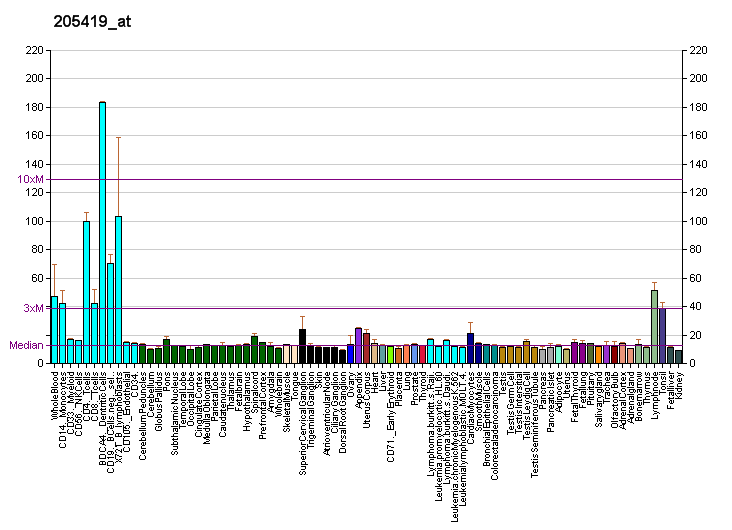
RNA expression pattern
Bgee	Human / Mouse (ortholog); Top expressed in: appendix; gallbladder; lymph node; gonad; epithelium of nasopharynx; blood; granulocyte; spleen; rectum; superficial temporal artery / Top expressed in: mesenteric lymph nodes; spleen; blood; thymus; bone marrow; subcutaneous adipose tissue; stroma of bone marrow; morula; ankle; dermis; More reference expression data
BioGPS	More reference expression data
Gene ontology
Molecular function	signal transducer activity; oxysterol binding; G protein-coupled receptor activity
Cellular component	integral component of membrane; integral component of plasma membrane; membrane; plasma membrane
Biological process	G protein-coupled receptor signaling pathway; B cell activation involved in immune response; mature B cell differentiation involved in immune response; humoral immune response; positive regulation of B cell proliferation; immune response; signal transduction; positive regulation of ERK1 and ERK2 cascade; immune system process; regulation of astrocyte chemotaxis; leukocyte chemotaxis; adaptive immune response; dendritic cell chemotaxis; T cell chemotaxis; osteoclast differentiation; dendritic cell homeostasis; cell chemotaxis; T follicular helper cell differentiation
Sources:Amigo / QuickGO
Orthologs
Databases	NCBI: entry; OMA: entry
Species	Human	Mouse
Entrez	1880	321019
Ensembl	ENSG00000169508	ENSMUSG00000051212
UniProt	P32249	Q3U6B2
RefSeq (mRNA)	NM_004951	NM_183031
RefSeq (protein)	NP_004942	NP_898852
Location (UCSC)	Chr 13: 99.29 – 99.31 Mb	Chr 14: 122.19 – 122.2 Mb
PubMed search
- Wikidata
View/Edit Human	View/Edit Mouse

G-protein coupled receptor 183 also known as Epstein-Barr virus-induced G-protein coupled receptor 2 (EBI2) is a protein (GPCR) expressed on the surface of some immune cells, namely B cells and T cells; in humans it is encoded by the GPR183 gene. Expression of EBI2 is one critical mediator of immune cell localization within lymph nodes, responsible in part for the coordination of B cell, T cell, and dendritic cell movement and interaction following antigen exposure. EBI2 is a receptor for oxysterols. The most potent activator is 7α,25-dihydroxycholesterol (7α,25-OHC), with other oxysterols exhibiting varying affinities for the receptor. Oxysterol gradients drive chemotaxis, attracting the EBI2-expressing cells to locations of high ligand concentration. The GPR183 gene was identified due to its upregulation during Epstein-Barr virus infection of the Burkitt's lymphoma cell line BL41, hence its name: EBI2.

== Tissue distribution and function ==
=== B cells ===
EBI2 helps B cell homing to the outer follicular region within a lymph node. Approximately three hours following B cell exposure to plasma-soluble antigen, EBI2 is upregulated via the transcription factor BRRF1. More surface receptors binding the oxysterol ligand results in cellular migration up the gradient, to the outer follicular region. The reason for this early migration is still unknown; however, because soluble antigen enters lymph nodes via afferent lymphatic vasculature, near the outer region of the follicle, it is hypothesized that B cell movement is motivated by increased exposure to the antigen. Six hours after antigen exposure, EBI2 is downregulated to low levels, permitting the B cells to migrate to the border between the B cell and T cell zones of the lymph node. Here, B cells interact with T helper cells previously activated by antigen-presenting dendritic cells. Though CCR7 is the dominant receptor in this stage of B cell migration, EBI2 is still critical, the low expression of which contributes to organized interaction along the T zone border that maximizes interactions with T cells. Following B cell receptor and CD40 co-stimulation, EBI2 is again upregulated. The B cells thus move back toward the outer follicular space, where they begin cell division. At this point, a B cell either downregulates EBI2 expression in order to enter a germinal center or maintains EBI2 expression and remains in outer follicular regions. In germinal centers (GC), B cells downregulate the receptor via the transcriptional repressor B-cell lymphoma-6 (BCL6) and, following somatic hypermutation, differentiate into long-lived antibody-secreting plasma cells or memory B cells. EBI2 must turn off to move B cells to the germinal center from the periphery, and must turn on for B cells to exit the germinal center and re-enter the periphery. Meanwhile, those remaining outside the follicle differentiate into plasmablasts, eventually becoming short-lived plasma cells. Thus, EBI2 expression modulates B cell differentiation by directing cells toward or away from germinal centers.

=== T cells ===
EBI2 also regulates intra-lymphatic T cell migration. Mature T helper cells upregulate EBI2 to follow the oxysterol gradient, migrating to the outer edges of the T cell zone to receive signals from antigen-presenting dendritic cells arriving from the tissues. This migration is critical as the resulting T cell-DC interaction induces T helper cell differentiation into T follicular helper cells. In concert with upregulation of CXCR5, the downregulation of EBI2 helps T follicular helper cells move toward the follicle center to help B cells undergoing affinity maturation in germinal centers.

=== Dendritic cells ===
EBI2 expression on CD4+ dendritic cells is a key initiator of immune response. Antigen-activated dendritic cells are driven to lymph node bridging channels via the oxysterol-EBI2 pathway. In the spleen, bridging channels connect the marginal zone, where dendritic cells pick up plasma-soluble antigen, to the T cell zone, where they present antigen to T helper cells. This results in T cell proliferation and differentiation. Localization to bridging channels is also associated with dendritic cell reception of lymphotoxin beta signaling, which augments their blood pathogen uptake, resulting in an increase in T cell responses.

== Ligand ==
Oxysterols bind to and activate EBI2. The highest affinity oxysterol ligand is 7α,25-dihydroxycholesterol (7α,25-OHC), formed by enzymatic oxidation of cholesterol by the hydroxylases CH25H and CYP7B1. 7α,25-OHC is concentrated in bridging channels and the outer perimeter of B cell follicles. Conversely it is not present in follicle centers, germ centers, nor in the T zone. The enzymes responsible for ligand biosynthesis, CH25H and CYP7B1, are unsurprisingly abundant in lymphoid stromal cells. On the other hand, the enzyme that deactivates the ligand, HSD3B7, is highly concentrated in areas where the ligand concentration should be lowest—the T zone. Though it is not a cytokine, the EBI2 ligand acts much like a chemokine in that its gradient drives cellular migration.

== Virus infection ==
GPR183 plays a crucial role in driving inflammation in the lungs during severe viral respiratory infections such as influenza A virus (IAV) and SARS-CoV-2. Studies using preclinical murine models of infection revealed that the activation of GPR183 by oxidized cholesterols leads to the recruitment of monocytes/macrophages and the production of inflammatory cytokines in the lungs.
