= Duodenal-type follicular lymphoma =

- Other names: Duodenal follicular lymphoma
- Specialty: Hematology, oncology

Duodenal-type follicular lymphoma (DFL) is a form of lymphoma in which certain lymphocyte types, the B-cell-derived centrocytes and centroblasts, form lymph node follicle-like structures principally in the duodenum and other parts of the small intestine. It is an indolent disease which on rare occasions progresses to a more aggressive lymphoma that spreads beyond these originally involved sites.

The disorder now termed DFL had been considered to be a follicular lymphoma that develops in one or more sites of the GI tract (i.e. stomach, duodenum, jejunum, small intestine, large intestine and rectum) as well as in various sites outside of the GI tract; this contrasts with other forms of follicular lymphoma which do not involve the GI tract. The disorder was regarded as a subtype of follicular lymphoma termed primary intestinal follicular lymphomas or primary gastrointestinal tract follicular lymphomas. However, follicular lymphomas of the duodenum and other parts of the small intestine differ from the other forms of primary intestinal lymphomas in that they are indolent, highly localized disorders that have a low rate of progression to a systemic disease. In consequence, the World Health Organization (2017) kept the more widespread primary intestinal lymphomas within the follicular lymphoma category and reclassified duodenal-/small intestinal-localized lymphoma as a distinct disease entity, DFL.

DFL, while currently considered a malignant disease, has many clinical features which are more similar to the benign predecessor of follicular lymphomas viz., in situ follicular lymphoma, than to follicular lymphoma. Like in situ follicular lymphoma, DFL is most commonly a symptom-free disease that is diagnosed incidentally in patients who are undergoing endoscopy for other reasons. Also like in situ follicular lymphoma, DFL may in rare cases regress spontaneously or progress to a more serious and aggressive form.

== Presentation ==
DFL most commonly afflicts middle-aged adults with a male to female ration of ~1. The disease is usually asymptomatic and diagnosed as an unexpected finding when examining patients by upper GI tract endoscopy conducted for other reasons. A minority of patients present vague abdominal symptoms or, rarely, more specific and serious symptoms such as obstructive jaundice caused by tumors in the duodenum which occlude the bile duct. The endoscopic examination typically reveals one or more polyps, nodules, or confluent whitish granules located in various parts of the GI tract which in a study of 54 patients conducted in Japan were distributed as follows: first (i.e. superior or bulbus) part of the duodenum, 4 patients; second (i.e. descending) part of the duodenum, 54 patients; combined third (i.e. horizontal or inferior), and fourth (i.e. ascending) part of the duodenum, 31 patients; jejunum, 44 patients; ileum, 17 patients; cecum, 13 patients; colon and rectum, each 2 patients; and stomach and esophagus, no patients. Lesions were limited to the second part of the duodenum in only 7 patients. In some cases, the lesions may be ulcerated.

== Pathophysiology ==
DFL is due to the accumulation of monoclonal (i.e. cells descendent from a single ancestral cell) centrocytes and their precursor centroblasts to form follicle-like structures in the duodenum and other parts of the small intestine. In virtually all cases of the disease, these cells bear a pathological genomic abnormality that is typical of most but not all forms of follicular lymphoma, i.e. a translocation between position 32 on the long (i.e. "q") arm of chromosome 14 and position 21 on chromosome 18's q arm. This t(14:18)q32:q21) translocation juxtaposes the B-cell lymphoma 2 (BCL2) gene on chromosome 18 at position q21.33 near to the immunoglobulin heavy chain locus (IGH@) on chromosome 14 at position q21, and in consequence causes the overexpression of this gene's product protein, BCL2 apoptosis regulator (i.e. Bcl2). Blc2 functions to inhibit programmed cell death thereby prolonging cell survival. The overexpression of Bcl2 in the B-cells of ISFL is thought to be a critical factor in their pathological accumulation and subsequent malignant progression. Gene expression profiling studies find that the tissues involved in DFP highly express certain genes that are unlike those expressed by the tissues in other forms of follicular lymphoma and more closely match those expressed by the tissues in MALT lymphoma, a lymphoma involving the mucosa-associated lymphoid tissue of the GI tract, airways, conjunctiva, vulvo-vagina tract, and skin. The highly express genes in both disorders include: 1) CCL20, a chemokine that is a chemoattractant for lymphocytes and 2) MAdCAM-1, a cell adhesion protein on mucosal vascular endothelial cells that binds to the α4β7 homing receptor on lymphocytes. and 3) C-C chemokine receptor type 6, which is the lymphocyte receptor for CCL20. Working together, these genomic abnormalities are thought to deliver virtually immortalized centrocytes and centroblasts to the involved GI tract tissues in duodenal-type follicular lymphoma. Furthermore, The malignant cells in DFL express immunoglobulin heavy chains made from specific rather than various gene segments of the IGH@ region on chromosome 14. In one study, for example, heavy chains made from VH4 and VH5 segments were expressed in a higher percentage of DFL cases than expected. These findings, along with those showing similarities in the profiles of highly expressed genes in DFL and mantle cell lymphoma suggest that DFL, like mantle cell lymphoma, develops as a consequence of chronic inflammation and specific antigen stimulation. In support of this possibility, there have been reports that DFL regresses in patients who are successfully treated for concurrent Helicobacter pylori infestation of the GI tract.

== Diagnosis ==
Histological examination of the lesions in DFL usually reveals them to be localized to the GI tract mucosa and submucosa. The lesions consist of abnormal germinal center-containing lymphoid follicles overcrowded with a uniformly-sized population of malignant centrocytes and rare centroblasts. The lesions are classified as low grade (i.e. Lugano classification Grades 1 or 2) in 95-100% of cases. Immunochemical analyses indicate that the latter cells express CD20, CD10, BCL6, and CD79A and have a very low proliferation rate as defined by the intensity of their expression of Ki-67. They also overexpress Bcl2 as a consequence of having the t(14:18)q32:q21) translocation. These findings are similar to those in follicular lymphoma but the malignant cells in DFL generally have fewer genomic abnormalities than those in follicular lymphoma and the profile of overexpressed genes in DFL tissues more closely resemble those in marginal zone than follicular lymphoma tissues. The diagnosis of DFL depends on finding: the cited histological, and immunochemical abnormalities; the t(14:18)q32:q21) translocation; and no evidence that the disease ranges outside of the GI tract as evidenced by negative results for, e.g. bone marrow biopsy and CT scan of the abdomen which thereby rule out involvement of the bone marrow and mesenteric as well as other abdominal lymph node, respectively.

=== Differential diagnoses ===
Follicular lymphoma differs from DFL by having: lesions which commonly lie outside of the GI tract sites outlined in the Presentation section; a histology more often categorized as Grade 3; and malignant cells that express activation-induced cytidine deaminase but not CD27, CCL20, MAdCAM-1, or C-C chemokine receptor type 6.

MALT lymphoma differs from DFL by having: lesions which commonly lie in the stomach and other tissues outside of the GI tract sites outlined in the Presentation section (except for a special subtype of malt lymphoma termed immunoproliferative small intestinal disease that is endemic to the Middle East); involvement of malignant B-cells that do not express CD5, CD10, or BCL6 and commonly have a translocation between chromosomes 18 and 11, i.e. t(11:18) but not the t(14:18)q32:q21) translocation; and associations with chronic inflammatory diseases and chronic antigen stimulation;

Mantle cell lymphoma differs from DFL by having: only occasional involvement of the GI tract with polyps that on histologic examination may involve the lamina propria and often infiltrate between rather that replacing intestinal glands and malignant cells which commonly express cyclin D1 and a translocation between chromosomes 11 and 14, i.e. t(11:14) but not the t(14:18)q32:q21). translocation.

== Treatment ==
DFL is generally an indolent disease which progresses to a more aggressive form in <10% of cases. A watch-and-wait strategy has been a generally recommended treatment for the disease in the United States, Japan, and Europe. However, numerous approaches have been used to treat the disease. Patients with disease that is contained within a limited radiation field have been treated with radiation therapy to attain overall 10 year survival rates of 60-80%. However, one study found that radiation-treated patients had a relapse rate of 48%. A retrospective analysis conducted on a small number (i.e. 63) of patients found complete regression rates for a watch-and-wait tactic, radiotherapy, and rituximab (a monoclonal antibody directed against CD20) of 29%, 100%, 80%, respectively. The complete regression rate for a CHOP chemotherapy regimen, CHOP plus rituximab regimen, radiotherapy plus rituximab regimen, pancreaticoduodenectomy (i.e. surgical removal of the duodenum and pancreas), and other chemotherapeutic regimens, when combined as a single group, was 64%. Only two patients in this study had diseases which progressed to outside of the GI tract; both were in the watch-and-wait group. Until further studies are conducted to define the optimal regimens for treating DFL, most patients with the disease are being initially treated with a watch-and-wait approach in order to avoid the toxic side-effects of the cited alternate regimens.
