= Centroblast =

Enlarged B cell in the germinal center of lymphoid follicles

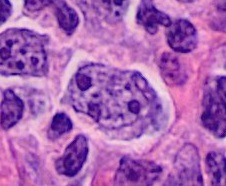
Histopathology of a centroblast in a follicular lymphoma, H&E stain. They are relatively large cells containing vesicular nuclei with one to three basophilic nucleoli apposing the nuclear membrane.

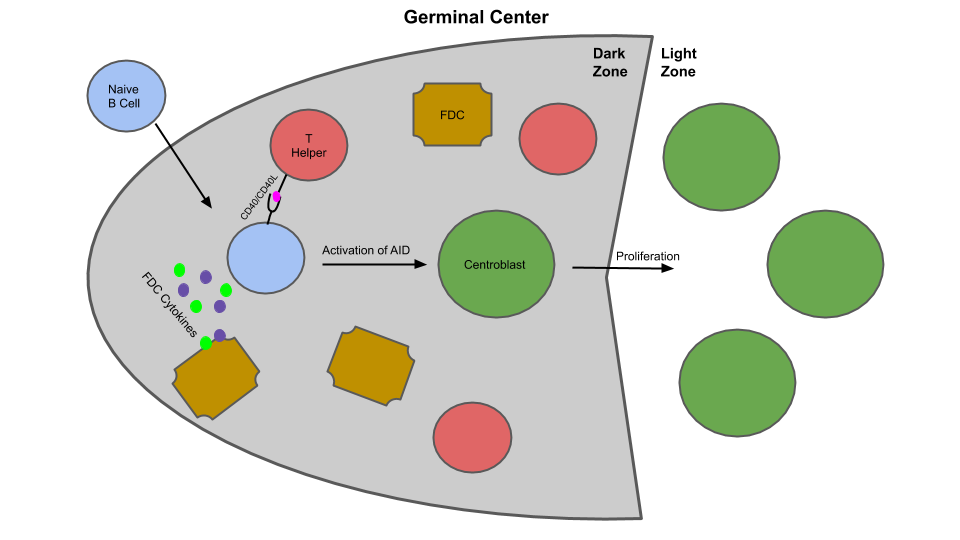
Model of centroblast development

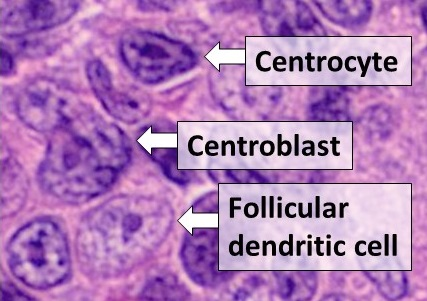
Histologic comparison of cell types in a germinal center, H&E stain: Centrocytes are small to medium size with angulated, elongated, cleaved, or twisted nuclei.; Centroblasts are larger cells containing vesicular nuclei with one to three basophilic nucleoli apposing the nuclear membrane.; Follicular dendritic cells have round nuclei, centrally located nucleoli, bland and dispersed chromatin, and flattening of adjacent nuclear membrane.

In immunology, a centroblast generally refers to an activated B cell that is enlarged (12–18 micrometer) and is rapidly proliferating in the germinal center of a lymphoid follicle. They are specifically located in the dark zone of the germinal center. Centroblasts form from naive B cells being exposed to follicular dendritic cell cytokines, such as IL-6, IL-15, 8D6, and BAFF. Stimulation from helper T cells is also required for centroblast development. Interaction between CD40 ligand on an activated helper T cell and the B cell CD40 receptor induces centroblasts to express activation-induced cytidine deaminase, leading to somatic hypermutation, allowing the B cell receptor to potentially gain stronger affinity for an antigen. In the absence of FDC and helper T cell stimulation, centroblasts are unable to differentiate and will undergo CD95-mediated apoptosis.

Morphologically, centroblasts are large lymphoid cells containing a moderate amount of cytoplasm, round to oval vesicular (i.e. containing small fluid-filled sacs) nuclei, vesicular chromatin, and 2–3 small nucleoli often located adjacent to the nuclear membrane. They are derived from B cells. Immunoblasts are distinguished from centroblasts by being B cell-derived lymphoid cells that have moderate-to-abundant basophilic cytoplasm and a prominent, centrally located, trapezoid-shaped single nucleolus which often has fine strands of chromatin attached to the nuclear membrane (‘spider legs’). In some cases, immunoblasts can show some morphologic features of plasma cells.

Centroblasts do not express immunoglobulins and are unable to respond to the follicular dendritic cell antigens present in the secondary lymphoid follicles. However, they are able to promote the secretion of immunoglobulins though CD27/CD70 interactions. B cells begin expressing CD27 at the beginning of the centroblast stage and lose the cell marker after differentiating into centrocytes. CD27 is an important marker for germinal center formation in the lymphoid follicle and is produced by centroblasts interacting with CD28+ helper T cells. The production of the germinal center is important for the production of antibody secreting plasma cells and memory B cells. After proliferation, centroblasts migrate to the light zone of the germinal center and eventually give rise to centrocytes.
