= Tingible body macrophage =

Type of microphage

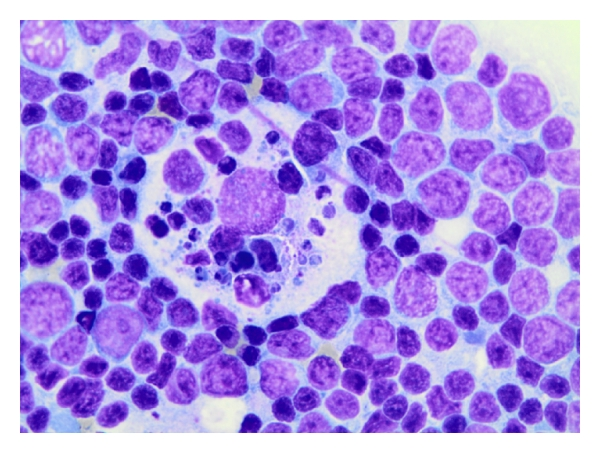
A tingible body macrophage.

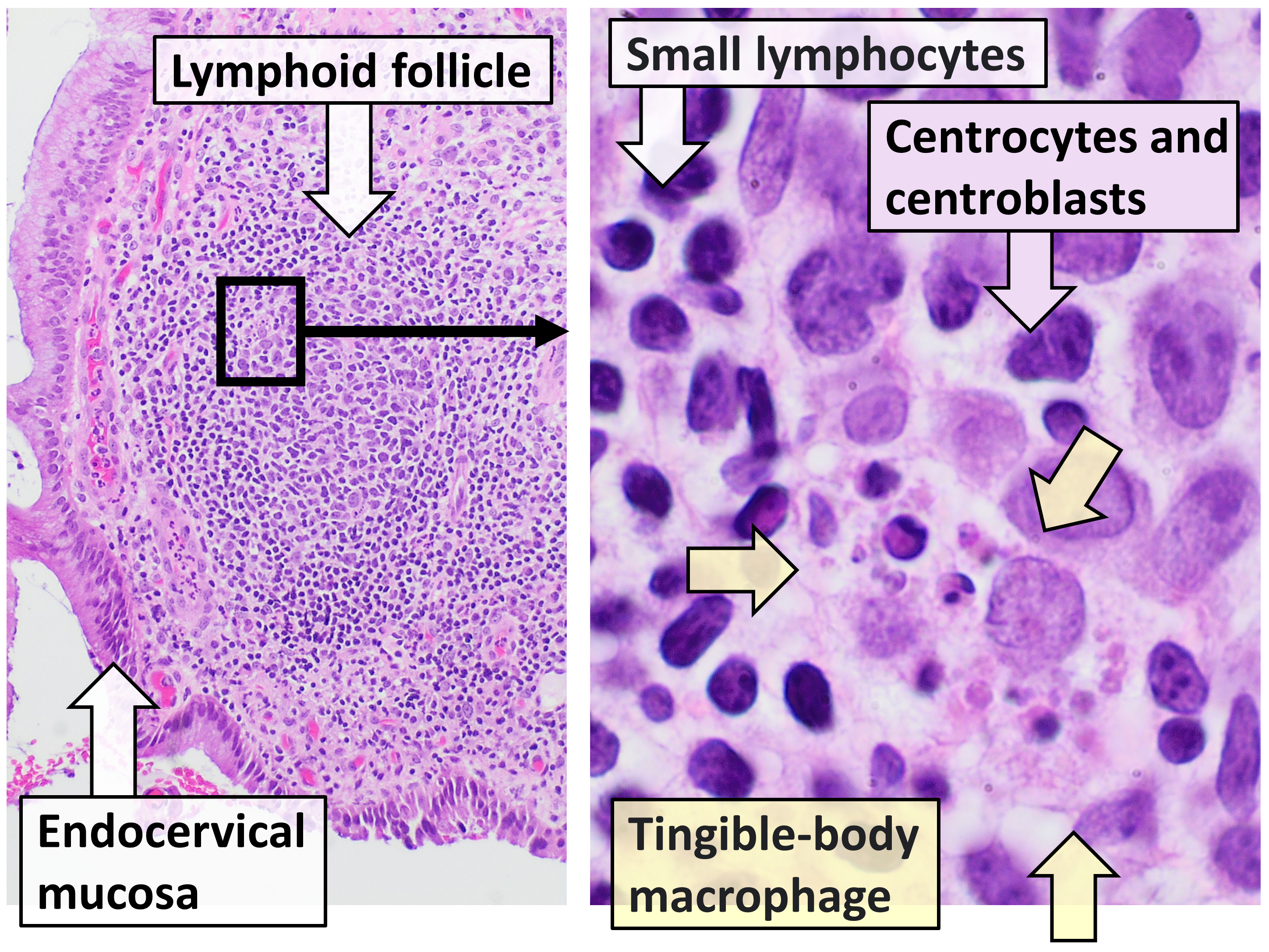
Follicular cervicitis, H&E stain, with typical features, including tingible-body macrophages.

A tingible body macrophage (TBM) is a type of macrophage predominantly found in germinal centers of lymph nodes. They contain many phagocytized, apoptotic cells in various states of degradation, referred to as tingible bodies (tingible meaning stainable). Tingible body macrophages contain condensed chromatin fragments.

TBMs are licensed (empowered) for phagocytosis by follicular dendritic cells (FDCs). FDCs provide TBMs with MFGE8 protein, which is a phosphatidylserine-binding "eat me" signal for removal of apoptotic germinal center B cells.

It is thought that they may play a role in downregulating the germinal center reaction by the release of prostaglandins and hence a reduced B-cell induction of IL-2.

Macrophages that contain debris from ingested lymphocytes are characteristic of a reactive follicular center in benign reactive lymphadenitis. Other accompanying signs of a benign follicular hyperplasia are well developed germinal centers with dark and light zones, in addition to numerous mitotic figures.
