= Follicular B helper T cells =

Type of immune cell involved in germinal center formation and maintenance

Follicular helper T cells (also known as T follicular helper cells and abbreviated as T_{FH}), are antigen-experienced CD4^{+} T cells found in the periphery within B cell follicles of secondary lymphoid organs such as lymph nodes, spleen and Peyer's patches, and are identified by their constitutive expression of the B cell follicle homing receptor CXCR5. Upon cellular interaction and cross-signaling with their cognate follicular (Fo B) B cells, T_{FH} cells trigger the formation and maintenance of germinal centers through the expression of CD40 ligand (CD40L) and the secretion of IL-21 and IL-4. T_{FH} cells also migrate from T cell zones into these seeded germinal centers, predominantly composed of rapidly dividing B cells mutating their Ig genes. Within germinal centers, T_{FH} cells play a critical role in mediating the selection and survival of B cells that go on to differentiate either into long-lived plasma cells capable of producing high affinity antibodies against foreign antigen, or germinal center-dependent memory B cells capable of quick immune re-activation in the future if ever the same antigen is re-encountered. T_{FH} cells are also thought to facilitate negative selection of potentially autoimmune-causing mutated B cells in the germinal center. However, the biomechanisms by which T_{FH} cells mediate germinal center tolerance are yet to be fully understood.

It is possible that T_{FH} cells might arise as branches in the Th1 and Th2 differentiation pathways but their precise lineage relationship to the other effector CD4^{+} T cell subsets is still uncertain. Studies have however shown that T_{FH} have distinct gene expression profiles, supporting the theory that T_{FH} are a subset of CD4^{+} T cells distinct from Th-1, Th-2, Th-17 or Tregs.

The function of T_{FH} cells. A subset of naive T cells in the T cell zone are activated by antigen and migrate to the follicles where they differentiate into T_{FH} cells that interact with and instruct Follicular B (Fo B) cells to undergo isotype switching, somatic hypermutation, and rapid cellular division to seed germinal centers (GC). Within these germinal centers, T_{FH} cells continue to provide help to GC B cells to facilitate their production of high affinity antibody–producing plasma cells (PC) and long-lived memory (Mem) B cells.

== Biomolecular characterization ==
The inducible T-cell co-stimulator (CD278 or ICOS) is proven to provide a particularly critical signal for T_{FH} cells since experimental mice deficient in ICOS are unable to develop any T_{FH}. Additionally, it has been shown that ICOS induces the secretion of IL-21 cytokine by activated CD4^{+} T cells and that IL-21 plays a crucial role in the development of T_{FH} cells and germinal centers. Also Bcl-6 is a transcription factor identified in T_{FH} cells, but it may have roles that extend beyond this subset, because it has also been implicated in memory CD8^{+} T cell development.

In germinal centers, antigen-experienced T_{FH} cells rapidly upregulate the expression of CD40L, which binds and stimulates the B cell surface receptor CD40. T_{FH} cell-dependent paracrine activation of B cell CD40 results in B cell survival and differentiation, including the induction of AID (activation-induced (cytidine) deaminase). AID expression (encoded by the AICDA gene) causes B cell antibodies to class switch from IgM/IgD to other antibody isotypes and drives somatic hypermutation during clonal proliferation. The switched antibodies acquire better effector functions, and hypermutated antibody shows greater affinity for antigen.

== Classes of T_{FH} cells ==
T_{FH} cells formed early in the nascent stages of a germinal center reaction are formally called pre-T_{FH} cells. They are uniquely found predominantly at the border of the T cell zone that merges with the B cell follicles and germinal centers. Pre-T_{FH} cells are functionally very similar to other T_{FH} cells in facilitating germinal center B cell reactions; however, they are also capable of driving follicular B cell development adjacent to and outside of germinal centers to produce quickly responsive but non-durable plasma cell–driven antibody responses (known as the extrafollicular response).

Those T_{FH} cells specifically residing within a mature germinal center are sometimes referred to as GC T_{FH} cells (for germinal center T_{FH} cells) to distinguish them from pre-T_{FH} cells. There is also a minor sub-class within this population of GC Tfh cells that express the gene Foxp3, encoding for a transcription factor. This small discrete sub-population of cells, called T_{FR} cells (for T Follicular Regulatory cells), is important in helping to control and limit the magnitude of normal germinal center responses such that they avoid the potential to produce abnormally mutated or self-reactive autoimmune-associated antibodies. Therefore, T_{FR} cells are a uniquely inhibitory influence during a germinal center reaction.

While T_{FH} cells are found primarily in the secondary lymphoid organs, a small portion circulate in the blood and are termed peripheral T helper cells (T_{PH}). These cells share traits with T_{FH} cells such as secretion of IL-21 upon stimulation. However, they do not possess the chemokine receptor CXCR5 to the same degree as T_{PH} cells. This is because they express low levels of the T_{FH}-defining transcription factor Bcl-6. Lack of Bcl-6 means that other transcription factors are expressed at higher levels, leading to heightened expression of chemokines associated with movement into the tissues rather than remaining in a secondary lymphoid organ. In accordance with their presence in the tissue their effector function is limited to memory B cells unlike T_{FH} cells which can help both naïve and memory B cells. T_{PH} typically express similar levels of Inducible T cell co-stimulator (ICOS) compared to T_{FH} cells. ICOS is a member of the CD28/B7 superfamily and provides essential co-stimulatory signals to activated T cells. T_{PH} cells appear to contribute to early life immunity as well as during acute viral infection however they play a major role in chronic inflammation and autoimmune disorders such as Rheumatoid Arthritis (RA) and Systemic Lupus Erythematosus (SLE).

At the site of chronic inflammation, such as in synovium of people with RA, T_{PH} cells contribute to the creation of tertiary lymphoid structure (TLS). TLS are ectopic lymphoid aggregates that can form in non-lymphoid tissue during chronical inflammation, for example in auto immune diseases or cancer. TLS arise through chemokine-driven recruitment of immune cells, including T cells, B cells and dendritic cells (DCs) which cluster tightly. TLS often contain high endothelial venules (HEVs), a type of vessel important for lymphocyte entry. TLSs can be classified as early aggregates, immature TLSs containing follicular DCs network and mature TLS containing a germinal center. In many cancer types TLS correlate with better prognosis for cancer patients, as they seem to enhance anti-tumor response of the immune system. In autoimmunity TLS often sustain chronic inflammation. T_{PH} cells in RA secrete high levels of the chemokine CXCL13 which recruits B cells where T_{PH} carry out their function of activating memory B cells. This causes persistent antibody production and maintenance of high levels of B cells and inflammation. T_{PH} cells play a role in SLE as peripheral blood samples from people with SLE have higher counts of T_{PH} cells which is associated with higher levels of Type-I interferons and proinflammatory cytokines and greater migration into the skin and kidneys. T_{PH} from people with SLE also have higher levels of ICOS than normal which suggests that greater co-stimulatory signaling of activated T_{PH} cells contributes to autoimmunity and chronic inflammation.

== Medical relevance ==
=== Generating lasting immune memory ===
T_{FH} cells are considered an indispensable T cell subset in the generation and maintenance of germinal center responses. Therefore, in the absence of T_{FH} cells, similar to B cell activation by T-cell independent antigens, a quick burst of low affinity plasma cell production is formed but this does not lead to germinal center induction nor permit antibody affinity maturation or the differentiation of effective memory B cells which are essential in fortifying the body against subsequent infections. Specifically, germinal center-dependent memory B cells are the drivers of recall antibody production during a secondary immune response. Therefore, the proper activation and development of T_{FH} cells is central to the efficacy of immunizations and vaccine design for the induction of long-term immunity. In a Bangladeshi population study of patients infected with Vibrio cholerae and healthy human volunteers administered with an existing cholera vaccine, a memory T_{FH} response specifically against cholera antigen had correlated with further antibody production by B cells.

=== Role in Cancer ===
T_{FH} play a fundamental role in antitumor immunity by localizing predominantly within mature tertiary lymphoid structures (mTLS), where they facilitate structural organization and interaction between T and B lymphocytes. These cells are essential for the formation of functional germinal centers and the B-cell isotype switching (class switching) process, which enables a more mature and experienced humoral response against the tumor. In the context of non-small cell lung cancer (NSCLC) treated with neoadjuvant chemoimmunotherapy, a higher proportion of Tfh cells within mature TLS is directly associated with achieving a complete pathologic response

=== Controlling age-related immune decline ===
With normal aging comes a gradual diminishing of the body's immune system. This phenomenon called immunosenescence is largely due to a decline of T cell function, including the capacity for T_{FH} cells to properly support germinal center responses. This may be in part due to lower CD40L levels on the cell surface of T_{FH} cells in the aged.

=== Avoiding autoimmunity ===
Unchecked or overactive T_{FH} cell immune responses have the potential to mount unwarranted germinal centers, composed of aberrantly mutated B cells that can drive antibody-mediated autoimmune diseases. Elevated levels of T_{FH}-like cells can be detected in the blood of a subset of human patients with systemic lupus erythematosus (SLE) and Sjögren syndrome. However, scientific evidence suggesting T_{FH} cells can definitively cause autoimmunity in humans remains incomplete.
