= Naive B cell =

B cell not yet exposed to an antigen

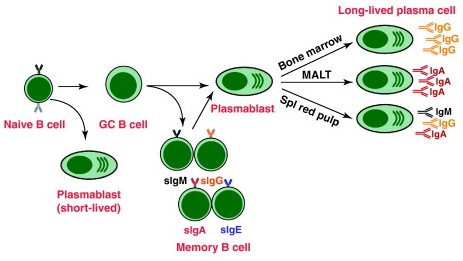
This is the naive B cell activation to a plasma cell. It shows the process.

In immunology, a naive B cell is a B cell that has not been exposed to an antigen. These are located in the tonsils, spleen, and primary lymphoid follicles in lymph nodes.

Once exposed to an antigen, the naive B cell either becomes a memory B cell or a plasma cell that secretes antibodies specific to the antigen that was originally bound. Plasma cells do not last long in the circulation; this is in contrast to memory cells that last for very long periods of time. Memory cells do not secrete antibodies until activated by their specific antigen.

Naive B cells play a key role in predicting humoral responses to COVID-19 mRNA vaccines in immunocompromised patients, specifically measuring naive B cell levels could help predict and improve vaccination outcomes.
