= Frexalimab =

Monoclonal antibody

Monoclonal antibody
- Type: Whole antibody
- Target: CD40 ligand

Clinical data
- AHFS/Drugs.com: Monograph
- License data: US DailyMed: Abelacimab; US FDA: Abelacimab

Legal status
- Legal status: Investigational

Identifiers
- PubChem SID: 319902621
- ChemSpider: none
- KEGG: D10821

Frexalimab (SAR441344) is a second-generation monoclonal antibody that inhibits CD40 ligand. It is in development by Sanofi for the treatment of relapsing multiple sclerosis.
