= Tegoprubart =

Experimental drug

Monoclonal antibody
- Type: ?

Clinical data
- Other names: AT-1501

Legal status
- Legal status: Investigational

Identifiers
- CAS Number: 2628092-47-5
- UNII: EK87C62XNH

Tegoprubart (AT-1501) is an experimental humanized monoclonal antibody that inhibits CD40L. It is developed for ALS and transplant rejection.

== Eledon Pharmaceuticals ==
In March 2026, clinical data presented at the Advanced Technologies and Treatments for Diabetes (ATTD) conference demonstrated that tegoprubart, a monoclonal antibody inhibiting the CD40 ligand, enabled 100% insulin independence in ten evaluable patients following allogeneic islet transplantation. The pilot study, conducted at the University of Chicago Medicine, utilized tegoprubart as part of a calcineurin inhibitor-free regimen, resulting in a mean HbA1c of 5.35% without evidence of nephrotoxicity or neurotoxicity typically associated with standard immunosuppressants.
