= CD78 =

Protein found in humans

CD78 is a protein expressed on the surface of some immature and all mature B-cells. It is considered a pan-B cell antigen. Other names include Cdw78, Ba antigen, Leu21 and LO-panB-a.

== Function ==
It is part of the MHC class II.

== Expression ==
CD78 is expressed on all stages of B cell development from pre-B cell through plasma cells. Its expression is strongest on activated B cells.

It is also present on tissue macrophages and on epithelial cells.

== Clinical significance ==
With flow cytometry, it can be used to detect B cells during many stages of their development. It is one of relatively few markers usefully expressed on plasma cells, and when combined with detection of markers such as CD22, can be used to determine the relative proportion of plasma cells.
