= FBXO11 =

Protein-coding gene in the species Homo sapiens

Identifiers
- Aliases: FBXO11, FBX11, PRMT9, UBR6, VIT1, UG063H01, F-box protein 11, IDDFBA
- External IDs: OMIM: 607871; MGI: 2147134; GeneCards: FBXO11

Gene location (Human)
Chr.	Chromosome 2 (human)
Band	2p16.3	Start	47,789,316 bp
Band	2p16.3	End	47,906,498 bp

Gene location (Mouse)
Chr.	Chromosome 17 (mouse)
Band	17 E4|17 57.87 cM	Start	88,298,287 bp
Band	17 E4|17 57.87 cM	End	88,372,719 bp
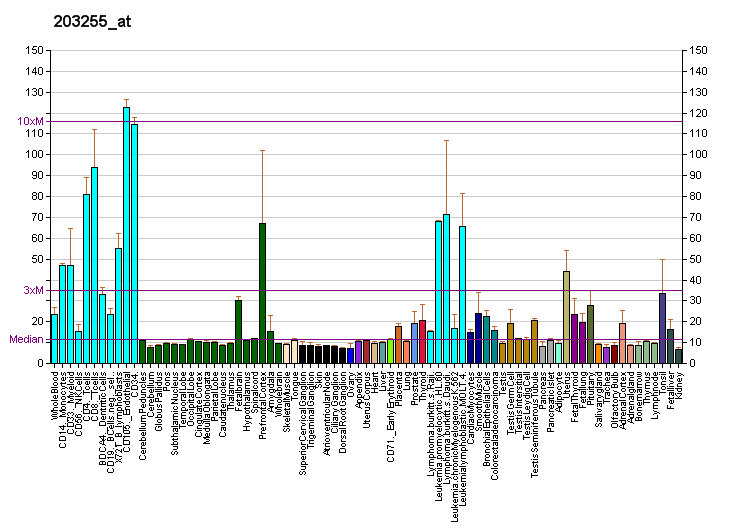

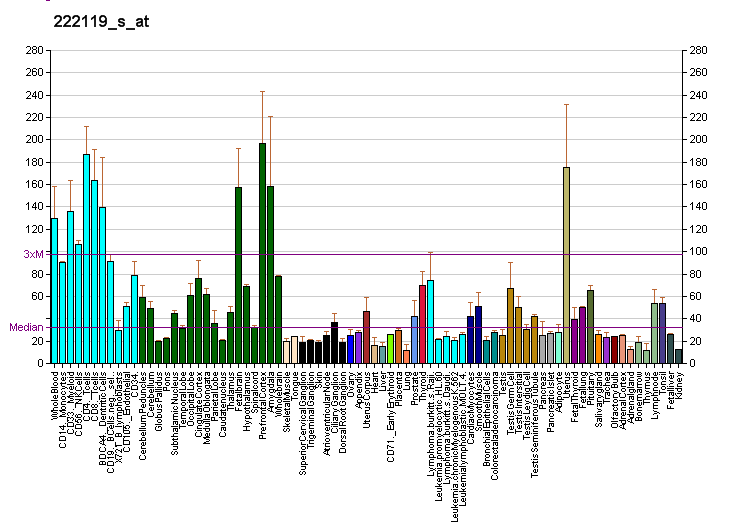
RNA expression pattern
Bgee	Human / Mouse (ortholog); Top expressed in: ganglionic eminence; ventricular zone; cerebellar hemisphere; mucosa of paranasal sinus; Achilles tendon; right hemisphere of cerebellum; superficial temporal artery; ovary; left ovary; trabecular bone / Top expressed in: zygote; lateral septal nucleus; Gonadal ridge; ventromedial nucleus; mammillary body; pineal gland; anterior amygdaloid area; lateral hypothalamus; paraventricular nucleus of hypothalamus; ventral tegmental area; More reference expression data
BioGPS	More reference expression data
Gene ontology
Molecular function	zinc ion binding; protein binding; protein-arginine N-methyltransferase activity; metal ion binding; ubiquitin-protein transferase activity
Cellular component	ubiquitin ligase complex; cytoplasm; nucleolus; nucleus; chromosome; cytosol
Biological process	hearing; protein ubiquitination; ubiquitin-dependent protein catabolic process; peptidyl-arginine N-methylation; protein polyubiquitination; post-translational protein modification; regulation of apoptotic process
Sources:Amigo / QuickGO
Orthologs
Databases	NCBI: entry; OMA: entry
Species	Human	Mouse
Entrez	80204	225055
Ensembl	ENSG00000138081	ENSMUSG00000005371
UniProt	Q86XK2	Q7TPD1
RefSeq (mRNA)	NM_001190274; NM_012167; NM_018693; NM_025133; NM_001374325	NM_001081034; NM_001348248; NM_001379303; NM_001379304; NM_001379305
RefSeq (protein)	NP_001177203; NP_079409; NP_001361254	NP_001074503; NP_001335177; NP_001366232; NP_001366233; NP_001366234
Location (UCSC)	Chr 2: 47.79 – 47.91 Mb	Chr 17: 88.3 – 88.37 Mb
PubMed search
- Wikidata
View/Edit Human	View/Edit Mouse

F-box only protein 11 is a protein that in humans is encoded by the FBXO11 gene.

== Function ==
This gene encodes a member of the F-box protein family which is characterized by an approximately 40 amino acid motif, the F-box. The F-box proteins constitute one of the four subunits of ubiquitin protein ligase complex called SCFs (SKP1-cullin-F-box), which function in phosphorylation-dependent ubiquitination. The F-box proteins are divided into 3 classes: Fbws containing WD-40 domains, Fbls containing leucine-rich repeats, and Fbxs containing either different protein-protein interaction modules or no recognizable motifs. The protein encoded by this gene belongs to the Fbxs class. Alternatively spliced transcript variants encoding distinct isoforms have been identified for this gene.

FBXO11 is conserved from nematodes to mammals, and both human FBXO11 and its worm ortholog (DRE-1) form functional SCF ubiquitin ligase complexes. By binding to and mediating the degradation of its substrate proteins, FBXO11 plays important roles in regulating cell cycle regulation, tumorigenesis, and tumor cell metastasis. Well established targets of FBXO11 include BCL6, CDT2, and Snail.

== Clinical significance ==
Inactivation of FBXO11-mediated BCL6 degradation has been shown to contribute to abnormal germinal-center formation and tumorigenesis. The Caenorhabditis elegans DRE-1/FBXO11 was reported to target the conserved transcription factor BLMP-1 for proteasomal degradation, and thereby regulates developmental timing and maturation. The gene encoding FBXO11 was found to be deleted or mutated in multiple diffuse large B cell lymphoma (DLBCL) cell lines, and this inactivation of FBXO11 contributes to increased levels BCL6 and subsequently DLBCL pathogenesis. FBXO11 mutations were also identified in other human cancers, such as colon, lung, ovary, and head and neck tumors. In mice, a homozygous mutation of FBXO11 results in cleft palate defects, facial clefting, and perinatal lethality. Moreover, haploinsufficient mutant alleles cause otitis media, a disorder that affects approximately 15% of children.
