= Memory B cell =

Cell of the adaptive immune system

B lymphocytes are the cells of the immune system that make antibodies to invading pathogens like viruses. They form memory cells that remember the same pathogen for faster antibody production in future infections.

In immunology, a memory B cell (MBC) is a type of B lymphocyte that forms part of the adaptive immune system. These cells develop within germinal centers of the secondary lymphoid organs. Memory B cells circulate in the blood stream in a quiescent state, sometimes for decades. Their function is to memorize the characteristics of the antigen that activated their parent B cell during initial infection such that if the memory B cell later encounters the same antigen, it triggers an accelerated and robust secondary immune response. Memory B cells have B cell receptors (BCRs) on their cell membrane, identical to the one on their parent cell, that allow them to recognize antigen and mount a specific antibody response.Maintenance of the B-cell memory compartment in blood has been associated with a lower risk of relapse in NSCLC treated with perioperative chemoimmunotherapy.

== Development and activation ==
=== T cell dependent mechanisms ===
In a T-cell dependent development pathway, naïve follicular B cells are activated by antigen-presenting follicular B helper T cells (T_{FH}) during the initial infection, or primary immune response. Naïve B cells circulate through follicles in secondary lymphoid organs (i.e. spleen and lymph nodes) where they can be activated by a floating foreign peptide brought in through the lymph or by antigen presented by antigen-presenting cells (APCs) such as dendritic cells (DCs). B cells may also be activated by binding foreign antigen in the periphery where they then move into the secondary lymphoid organs. A signal transduced by the binding of the peptide to the B cell causes the cells to migrate to the edge of the follicle bordering the T cell area.

The B cells internalize the foreign peptides, break them down, and express them on class II major histocompatibility complexes (MHCII), which are cell surface proteins. Within the secondary lymphoid organs, most of the B cells will enter B-cell follicles where a germinal center will form. Most B cells will eventually differentiate into plasma cells or memory B cells within the germinal center. The T_{FH}s that express T cell receptors (TCRs) cognate to the peptide (i.e. specific for the peptide-MHCII complex) at the border of the B cell follicle and T-cell zone will bind to the MHCII ligand. The T cells will then express the CD40 ligand (CD40L) molecule and will begin to secrete cytokines which cause the B cells to proliferate and to undergo class switch recombination, a mutation in the B cell's genetic coding that changes their immunoglobulin type. Class switching allows memory B cells to secrete different types of antibodies in future immune responses. The B cells then either differentiate into plasma cells, germinal center B cells, or memory B cells depending on the expressed transcription factors. The activated B cells that expressed the transcription factor Bcl-6 will enter B-cell follicles and undergo germinal center reactions.

Once inside the germinal center, the B cells undergo proliferation, followed by mutation of the genetic coding region of their BCR, a process known as somatic hypermutation. The mutations will either increase or decrease the affinity of the surface receptor for a particular antigen, a progression called affinity maturation. After acquiring these mutations, the receptors on the surface of the B cells (B cell receptors) are tested within the germinal center for their affinity to the current antigen. B cell clones with mutations that have increased the affinity of their surface receptors receive survival signals via interactions with their cognate T_{FH} cells. The B cells that do not have high enough affinity to receive these survival signals, as well as B cells that are potentially auto-reactive, will be selected against and die through apoptosis. These processes increase variability at the antigen binding sites such that every newly generated B cell has a unique receptor.

After differentiation, memory B cells relocate to the periphery of the body where they will be more likely to encounter antigen in the event of a future exposure. Many of the circulating B cells become concentrated in areas of the body that have a high likelihood of coming into contact with antigen, such as the Peyer's patch.

The process of differentiation into memory B cells within the germinal center is not yet fully understood. Some researchers hypothesize that differentiation into memory B cells occurs randomly. Other hypotheses propose that the transcription factor NF-κB and the cytokine IL-24 are involved in the process of differentiation into memory B cells. An additional hypothesis states that the B cells with relatively lower affinity for antigen will become memory B cells, in contrast to B cells with relatively higher affinity that will become plasma cells.

=== T cell independent mechanisms ===
Not all B cells present in the body have undergone somatic hypermutations. IgM+ memory B cells that have not undergone class switch recombination demonstrate that memory B cells can be produced independently of the germinal centers.

== Primary response ==
Upon infection with a pathogen, many B cells will differentiate into the plasma cells, also called effector B cells, which produce a first wave of protective antibodies and help clear infection. Plasma cells secrete antibodies specific for the pathogens but they cannot respond upon secondary exposure. A fraction of the B cells with BCRs cognate to the antigen differentiate into memory B cells that survive long-term in the body. The memory B cells can maintain their BCR expression and will be able to respond quickly upon secondary exposure.

== Secondary response and memory ==
The memory B cells produced during the primary immune response are specific to the antigen involved during the first exposure. In a secondary response, the memory B cells specific to the antigen or similar antigens will respond. When memory B cells reencounter their specific antigen, they proliferate and differentiate into plasma cells, which then respond to and clear the antigen. The memory B cells that do not differentiate into plasma cells at this point can reenter the germinal centers to undergo further class switching or somatic hypermutation for further affinity maturation. Differentiation of memory B cells into plasma cells is far faster than differentiation by naïve B cells, which allows memory B cells to produce a more efficient secondary immune response. The efficiency and accumulation of the memory B cell response is the foundation for vaccines and booster shots.

The phenotype of memory cells that prognosticate plasma cells or germinal center cells fate has been discovered few years ago. Based on expression microarray comparisons between memory B cells and naïve B cells, it was identified that there are several surface proteins, such as CD80, PD-L2 and CD73 that are only expressed on the memory B cells, so they also serve to divide this cells in multiple phenotypic subsets. Moreover, it has been shown that the memory cells that express CD80, PD-L2 and CD73 are more likely to become plasma cells. On the other hand, the cells which don´t have these types of markers are more likely to form germinal center cells. The IgM^{+} memory B cells do not express CD80 or CD73, whereas IgG^{+} express them. Moreover, IgG^{+} are more likely to differentiate into antibody-secreting cells.

== Lifespan ==
Memory B cells can survive for decades, which gives them the capacity to respond to multiple exposures to the same antigen. The long-lasting survival is hypothesized to be a result of certain anti-apoptosis genes that are more highly expressed in memory B cells than other subsets of B cells. Additionally, the memory B cell does not need to have continual interaction with the antigen nor with T cells in order to survive long-term.

However, it is true that the lifespan of individual memory B cells remains poorly defined, although they have a critical role in long-term immunity. In one study using a B cell receptor (BCR) transgenic system (it was a H chain transgenic mouse model which lacked secreted Ig, so it didn´t deposit Ag-containing immune complexes), it was shown that the number of memory B cells remain constant for a period of around 8–20 weeks after the immunization. It was also estimated that the half-life of memory B cells was between 8–10 weeks, after doing an experiment in which the cells were treated in vivo with bromodeoxyuridine. In other experiments in mouse, it has been shown that the lifespan of memory B cells is at least 9 times greater than the lifespan of a follicular naïve B cell.

== Markers ==
Memory B cells are typically distinguished by the cell surface marker CD27, although some subsets do not express CD27. Memory B cells that lack CD27 are generally associated with exhausted B cells or certain autoimmune conditions such as HIV, lupus, or rheumatoid arthritis.

Because B cells have typically undergone class switching, they can express a range of immunoglobulin molecules. Some specific attributes of particular immunoglobulin molecules are described below:

- IgM: Memory B cells that express IgM can be found concentrated in the tonsils, Peyer's patch, and lymph nodes. This subset of memory B cells is more likely to proliferate and reenter the germinal center during a secondary immune response.
- IgG: Memory B cells that express IgG typically differentiate into plasma cells.
- IgE: Memory B cells that express IgE are very rare in healthy individuals. This may occur because B cells that express IgE more frequently differentiate into plasma cells rather than memory B cells
- IgD only: Memory B cells that express IgD are very rare. B cells with only IgD are found concentrated in the tonsils.

It is important to mention the importance of integration of signalling pathways related to the receptors of BCRs and TLRs in order to modulate the production of the antibodies by the expansion of the memory B cells. Therefore, there are different factors that provide the information in order to secret different types of antibodies. It has been demonstrated that the production of specific-IgG1, anaphylactic-IgG1 and total-IgE depends on the signal produce by TLR2 and Myd88. Moreover, the signal produce by TLR4 when it is stimulated by natterins (protein obtained from T. nattereri fish venom) accelerates the synthesis of the antibody IgE acting as an adjuvant, as it was shown in an in vivo experiment with mice.

The receptor CCR6 is generally a marker of B cells that will eventually differentiate into MBCs. This receptor detects chemokines, which are chemical messengers that allow the B cell to move within the body. Memory B cells may have this receptor to allow them to move out of the germinal center and into the tissues where they have a higher probability of encountering antigen.

It has been shown that memory B cells have high level expression of CCR6 as well as an increased chemotactic response to the CCR6 ligand (CCL20) in comparison with naïve B cells. Nevertheless, the primary humoral response and the maintenance of the memory B cells are not affected in CCR6-deficient mice. However, there is not an effective secondary response from the memory B cells when there is a reexposure of the antigen if the cells do not express CCR6. Therefore we can confirm that CCR6 is essential for the ability of memory B cells to be recalled to their cognate antigen as well as for the appropriate anatomical positioning of these cells.

== Subsets ==
=== Germinal center independent memory B cells ===
This subset of cells differentiates from activated B cells into memory B cells before entering the germinal center. B cells that have a high level of interaction with T_{FH} within the B cell follicle have a higher propensity of entering the germinal center. The B cells that develop into memory B cells independently from germinal centers likely experience CD40 and cytokine signaling from T cells. Class switching can still occur prior to interaction with the germinal center, while somatic hypermutation only occurs after interaction with the germinal center. The lack of somatic hypermutation is hypothesized to be beneficial; a lower level of affinity maturation means that these memory B cells are less specialized to a specific antigen and may be able to recognize a wider range of antigens.

T-independent memory B cells

T-independent memory B cells are a subset called B1 cells. These cells generally reside in the peritoneal cavity. When reintroduced to antigen, some of these B1 cells can differentiate into memory B cells without interacting with a T cell. These B cells produce IgM antibodies to help clear infection.

T-bet memory B cells

T-bet B cells are a subset that have been found to express the transcription factor T-bet. T-bet is associated with class switching. T-bet B cells are also thought to be important in immune responses against intracellular bacterial and viral infections.

== Vaccination ==
Vaccines are based on the notion of immunological memory. The preventative injection of a non-pathogenic antigen into the organism allows the body to generate a durable immunological memory. The injection of the antigen leads to an antibody response followed by the production of memory B cells. These memory B cells are promptly reactivated upon infection with the antigen and can effectively protect the organism from disease.

Long-lived plasma cells and memory B cells are responsible for the long-term humoral immunity elicited by most vaccines. An experiment has been carried in order to observe the longevity of memory B cells after vaccination, in this case with the smallpox vaccine (DryVax), which was selected due to the fact that smallpox was eradicated, so the immune memory to smallpox is a useful benchmark to understand the longevity of the immune memory B cells in the absence of restimulation. The study concluded that the specific memory B cells are maintained for decades, indicating that the immunological memory is long-lived in the B cell compartment after a robust initial antigen exposure.

== See also ==
- Memory T cell
