= Germinal center =

Lymphatic tissue structure

- Germinal center of a lymph node showing proliferation and development stages of a B cell.

Identifiers
- MeSH: D018858

Germinal centers or germinal centres (GCs) are transiently formed structures within B cell zone (follicles) in secondary lymphoid organs – lymph nodes, ileal Peyer's patches, and the spleen – where mature B cells are activated, proliferate, differentiate, and mutate their antibody genes (through somatic hypermutation aimed at achieving higher affinity) during a normal immune response; most of the germinal center B cells (B_{GC}) are removed by tingible body macrophages. There are several key differences between naive B cells and GC B cells, including level of proliferative activity, size, metabolic activity and energy production. The B cells develop dynamically after the activation of follicular B cells by T-dependent antigen. The initiation of germinal center formation involves the interaction between B and T cells in the interfollicular area of the lymph node, CD40-CD40L ligation, NF-kB signaling and expression of IRF4 and BCL6.

GC B cells cycle through the two distinct zones of the germinal center: the light zone and the dark zone. As they undergo rapid and mutative cellular division, B cells of the germinal center's dark zone are known as centroblasts. Once these B cells have stopped proliferating in the dark zone and moved to the light zone, they are known as centrocytes, and are subjected to selection by follicular helper T (T_{FH}) cells in the presence of follicular dendritic cells (FDCs). There are three possible fates for GC B cells that have been positively selected in the light zone: plasma cell, memory B cell or B cell licensed to return to the dark zone for proliferation and mutation. These three fates are achieved via the distinct mechanisms described below. Germinal centers are an important part of the B cell humoral immune response, acting as central factories for the generation of affinity matured B cells specialized in producing improved antibodies that effectively recognize antigen (e.g. infectious agents), and for the production of long-lived plasma cells and durable memory B cells.

== Naive B cells vs. germinal center B cells ==
There are several key differences between naive B cells and GC B cells. Naive B cells do not undergo lots of cell division. On the other hand, B cells in GC tend to divide rapidly and frequently, and they can have cell cycles as short as only five hours. As a result of their highly proliferative quality, GC B cells are larger in size and are more metabolically active, as compared to naive B cells. Although GC B cells have a greater energy demand than naive B cells, they mainly produce energy by the process of fatty acid oxidation, while naive B cells depend on glycolysis.

== Germinal center initiation ==
Germinal centers are initiated in the B cell follicle of the lymph node. Following activation of naive B cells in the lymph node follicles, the B cells migrate to the interfollicular areas so that they can interact with T cells. When the B and T cells interact, the antigen-specific T cell receptors bind the antigen + MHC presented by the B cells. Additionally, the T cells are able to help the B cells by the interaction of the T cell CD40 ligand with the B cell CD40 molecule, which causes a signaling cascade that is beneficial for the survival and proliferation of B cells. B cell receptor activation results in the activation of the NF-kB signaling pathway, which is essential for the initiation of the germinal center reaction. Specifically, the expression of IRF4 and BCL6 transcription factors are both required for germinal center development and regulated by NF-kB signaling. For example, BCL6 controls the location of B cells in the lymph node and allows them to have a higher tolerance to DNA damage, thus promoting the proliferation of GC B cells. All B cells begin by co-expressing antibodies that have IgM and IgD constant regions, but they are later able to exchange these constant regions for IgA, IgG or IgE constant regions and express antibodies of a different class type via class switch recombination. Class switch recombination occurs during the germinal center initiation phase. The precursors of germinal center B cells start to expand four days following immunization and polarize into dark zones and light zones a week after immunization.

== Two distinct germinal center zones: dark zone and light zone ==
There are two distinct regions of the germinal center: the light zone (LZ) and the dark zone (DZ). These two zones are formed from pre-GC B cells that proliferate and polarize seven days following immunization. GC B cells alternate between the dark zone and the light zone and undergo several rounds of mutation and selection, respectively.

=== Dark zone ===
The dark zone of the germinal center is proximal to the T cell zone in the lymph node, and it consists of GC B cells and reticular cells that resemble follicular dendritic cells. The B cells within the dark zone of the germinal center are called centroblasts. They are larger than the cells in the light zone of the germinal center and are more proliferative (i.e. undergo more cell division). Somatic hypermutation, a process in which the activation-induced cytidine deaminase (AID) enzyme randomly mutates the variable regions of the antibody and alters their affinity for the antigen, occurs in the dark zone. Additionally, B cells that were positively selected in the light zone because they express B cell receptors with high affinity for the antigen proliferate extensively in the dark zone, which is a process called clonal expansion. After somatic hypermutation and before entering the light zone, the old B cell receptors on the surfaces of the B cells are replaced with the new, mutated B cell receptors. B cells expressing B cell receptors that have decreased affinity for the antigen following somatic hypermutation undergo apoptosis, while B cells expressing B cell receptors that have increased affinity for the antigen after somatic hypermutation migrate to the light zone for further selection.

=== Light zone ===
The light zone consists of GC B cells and T follicular helper cells. It is proximal to the lymph node and near the network of follicular dendritic cells. The GC B cells in the light zone, known as centrocytes, are smaller, less abundant and divide less as compared to the GC B cells in the dark zone. The nearby follicular dendritic cells present the antigen to the light zone GC B cells that were mutated in the dark zone previously, and those with the highest affinity for the antigen are able to bind and receive help from T follicular helper cells that have T cell receptors specific for the same antigen. Therefore, the GC B cells in the light zone compete for antigen and stimulation by T follicular helper cells. The mechanism by which this occurs is that, when the B cell receptor binds the antigen presented by the follicular dendritic cells, the antigen is internalized. Then the antigen is bound by class II MHC and presented on the surface of the B cell to the T cell receptor, which allows the B cell to be helped by the T follicular helper cell. GC B cells that are best able to present antigen to T follicular helper cells and produce the strongest B cell receptor signal are positively selected in the light zone of the germinal center. Therefore, positive selection of GC B cells in the light zone results in B cells that express antibodies with high affinity for the antigen. The B cells that are positively selected in the light zone begin to express cMyc, which regulates the germinal center and the proliferation of the B cells in the germinal center. Finally, the positively-selected GC B cells (cMyc^{+}) are "licensed", which means they are ready to be sent back to the dark zone of the germinal center where they will further proliferate and be mutated by somatic hypermutation.

== Process ==
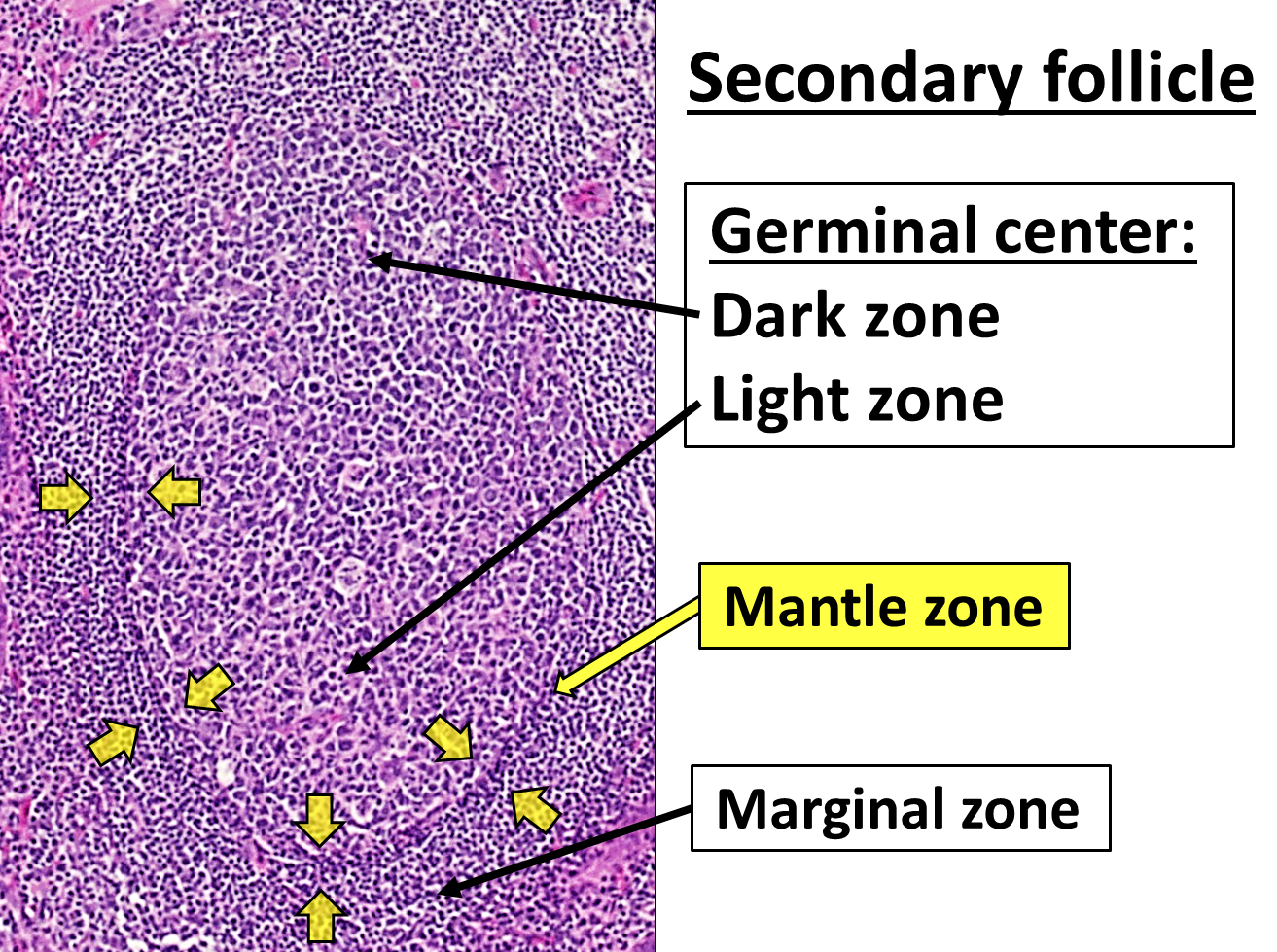
Histology of a normal secondary lymphoid follicle, showing dark, light, mantle and marginal zones

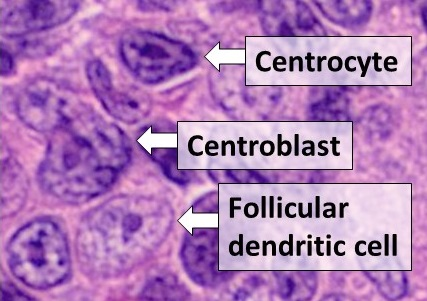
Histologic comparison of cell types in a germinal center, H&E stain: Centrocytes are small to medium size with angulated, elongated, cleaved, or twisted nuclei.; Centroblasts are larger cells containing vesicular nuclei with one to three basophilic nucleoli apposing the nuclear membrane.; Follicular dendritic cells have round nuclei, centrally located nucleoli, bland and dispersed chromatin, and flattening of adjacent nuclear membrane.

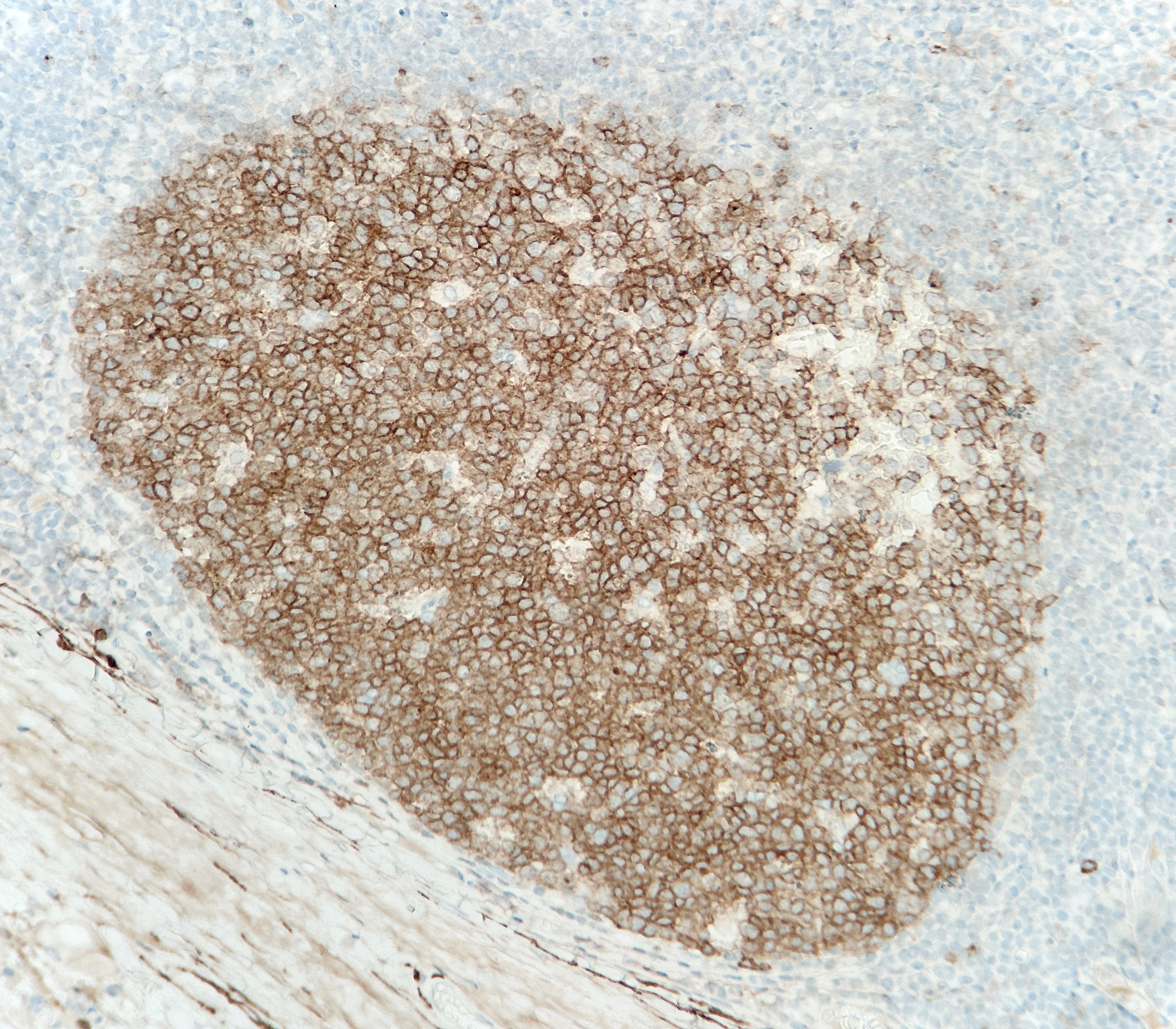
Immunohistochemistry of CD10 in the germinal center of a normal tonsil, conferring membranous staining of germinal-center B cells. The more uniformly dense CD10-positive portion toward the lower-left corresponds to the dark zone, rich in proliferating centroblasts. The scattered individual pale “holes” throughout are mostly nonstaining tingible-body macrophages. The upper-right part of the germinal center is the light zone, and generally appears less densely CD10-positive because it contains more follicular dendritic cells and T-follicular-helper cells among the CD10-positive centrocytes.

1. Within lymph nodes, mature peripheral B cells known as follicular (Fo) B cells acquire antigen from FDCs and in turn present it to cognate CD4+ T_{FH} cells at the border that demarcates the interfollicular T cell area and B cell zone (also known as lymphoid follicles).
2. After several rounds of cellular division, the B cells go through somatic hypermutation, a process by which they mutate their antibody-encoding DNA and thus generate a diversity of clones in the germinal center. This involves pseudo-random substitutions biased towards regions encoding the antigen recognition surface of the antibodies the B cells produce. This phenomenon underscores the process of affinity maturation, whereby greater affinity antibodies are produced and selected for after antigen recognition.
3. Upon receiving an unidentified stimulus, the maturing B cells (centroblasts) migrate from the dark zone to the light zone and start to express their edited BCRs on the cell surface and at this stage are referred to as centrocytes. The centrocytes are in a state of activated apoptosis and compete for survival signals derived from FDCs and T_{FH} cells. This rescue process, known as germinal center selection, is believed to be dependent on the affinity of their surface antibody to the antigen. Such that, a B cell that has successfully gained mutations that confer a higher affinity surface antibody towards antigen gains a survival advantage over lower affinity B cell clones and those that have gained deleterious mutations. Cyclic re-entry into the dark zone once again as centroblasts allows a chance for otherwise non-selected B cell mutants to gain more mutations in order to improve affinity towards antigen. Interactions with T cells are also believed to prevent the generation of autoreactive germinal center B cells.
4. At some unclear stage of their centroblast-centrocyte cycling, maturing B cells receive a final differentiation signal to exit the germinal center as an antibody producing plasma cell which are cells that secrete large quantities of antibody or a memory B cell that can be reactivated in subsequent contacts with the same antigen. Selected B cells may also restart the whole cycle of mutative centroblast division and centrocyte selection. In this way the adaptive immune system, in part through these germinal center reactions, can gradually better recognize antigens over time.

During affinity maturation and activation, B cells that produce autoantibodies are selected against, which is important for self-tolerance. While it is known that this selection can at times be very effective (for example, Campylobacter jejuni expresses lipooligosaccharides extremely similar to gangliosides, but only a small minority of infected people exhibit the Guillain–Barré syndrome caused by the targeting of gangliosides), very little is known about how it happens. Work in mice suggest that IgD-class B cell receptors are key.

== The role of T follicular helper cells in the germinal center ==
There are T helper cells in the follicles of the lymph nodes called T follicular helper cells that promote germinal center formation and the differentiation of GC B cells into plasma cells and memory B cells. T follicular helper cells mediate the germinal center reaction in two key ways. First, T follicular helper cells express CD40L, which is a tumor necrosis factor (TNF) protein that binds the CD40 molecule expressed on GC B cells. This interaction upregulates the NF-kB signaling pathway, which stimulates the division of GC B cells. Second, T follicular helper cells secrete the IL-21 cytokine which serves as a signal for GC B cells to proliferate and for the creation of plasma cells with long life spans.

== The fates of positively-selected germinal center B cells ==
Following positive selection, there are three possible fates for B cells undergoing the germinal center reaction: become a plasma cell, become a memory B cell or enter into the dark zone of the germinal center. The processes initiating each of these three fates are described below:

=== Plasma cell differentiation ===
The GC B cells that differentiate into plasma cells are B cells that show high affinity for the antigen. When GC B cells receive help from T follicular helper cells, there is an interaction between CD40 (expressed on the B cell) and CD40L (expressed on the T follicular helper cell), which increases the activation of NF-kB in the B cell. The upregulation of the NF-kB signaling pathway results in greater expression of IRF4, a transcription factor that is essential for plasma cell differentiation. The progression of the germinal center response results in plasma cells that secrete higher affinity antibodies having an increased lifespan and being sent to the bone marrow.

=== Memory B cell differentiation ===
The GC B cells that differentiate into memory B cells are distinct from plasma cell precursors, as they show lower affinity for the antigen and do not need much help from T follicular helper cells. Because of this, many scientists believe that memory B cell precursors are B cells from the light zone that were "non-positively selected." Memory B cell precursors express a transcription factor called hematopoietically-expressed homeobox protein (Hhex) that drives differentiation of memory B cells from GC B cells.

=== Entering the dark zone of the germinal center ===
Any B cells that were positively selected in the light zone of the germinal center, but that did not differentiate into plasma cells or memory B cells are sent to the dark zone of the germinal center for further proliferation. These are the B cells that had intermediate affinity for the antigen. The dark zone proliferation program is regulated by FoxO1 and cyclin D3. These two genes are down-regulated by strong BCR signals. Therefore, when there are weak BCR signals and the GC B cell does not have high affinity for the antigen, it will be sent to the dark zone of the germinal center so that it can continue to divide rather than being secreted as a plasma cell or a memory B cell.

== Morphology at different stages ==
The morphology of GCs is very specific and shows properties which are characteristic for different stages of the reaction.

- In an early state of the reaction a network of FDCs is fully filled with proliferating B cells.
- Later at day 4 of the reaction, GCs show a separation of two zones, the dark and the light zone. The former still contains dominantly proliferating and mutating B cells while the latter one is the area of B cell selection.
- These zones dissolve after 10 days of GC development which ends after about 3 weeks.

== Medical relevance ==
As germinal centers are important structures of the adaptive immune system, their deregulation is implied in many immune diseases, for example rheumatoid arthritis, immunodeficiency and many lymphomas like DLBCL and Burkitt's lymphoma.

== Evolution ==
Despite that V(D)J recombination is observed in all vertebrates, GC appeared in homeothermic animals. Under evolutionary new conditions, when elevated body temperature contributed to the increased rates of microorganism proliferation, dissemination in tissues, and their antigenic diversification , these temporary but constantly observed histological structures turned to be beneficial as their unique microenvironment could provide the conditions favourable for the shift from the initial broad to subsequent specific immune response resulting in B lineage cells differentiated to those producing high-affinity Ab and maintaining long-lasting humoral immune memory.

Among cold-blooded vertebrates, fish seem have functionally analogous structures represented by "clusters of Aicda^{+} cells encircled by pigmented 'melano-macrophages'".

== See also ==
- Lymphatic system
- Tingible body
- Mantle zone
