= CD40 ligand =

Protein found in humans

CD40LG
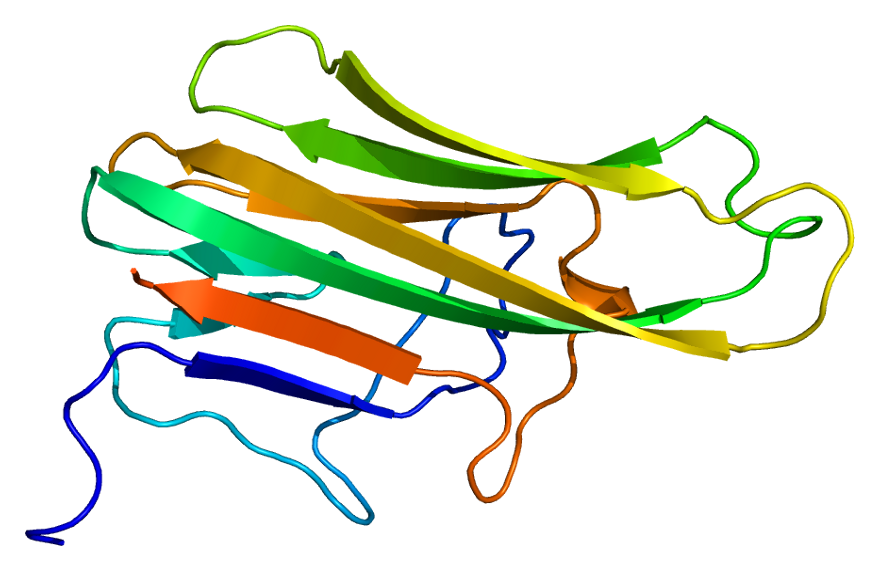

Identifiers
- Aliases: CD40LG, CD154, CD40L, HIGM1, IGM, IMD3, T-BAM, TNFSF5, TRAP, gp39, hCD40L, CD40 ligand
- External IDs: OMIM: 300386; MGI: 88337; GeneCards: CD40LG
Available structures
PDB	Ortholog search: PDBe RCSB
PDB	List of PDB id codes 1ALY, 1I9R, 3LKJ, 3QD6

Gene location (Human)
Chr.	X chromosome (human)
Band	Xq26.3	Start	136,648,158 bp
Band	Xq26.3	End	136,660,390 bp

Gene location (Mouse)
Chr.	X chromosome (mouse)
Band	X A6|X 31.21 cM	Start	56,257,503 bp
Band	X A6|X 31.21 cM	End	56,269,402 bp
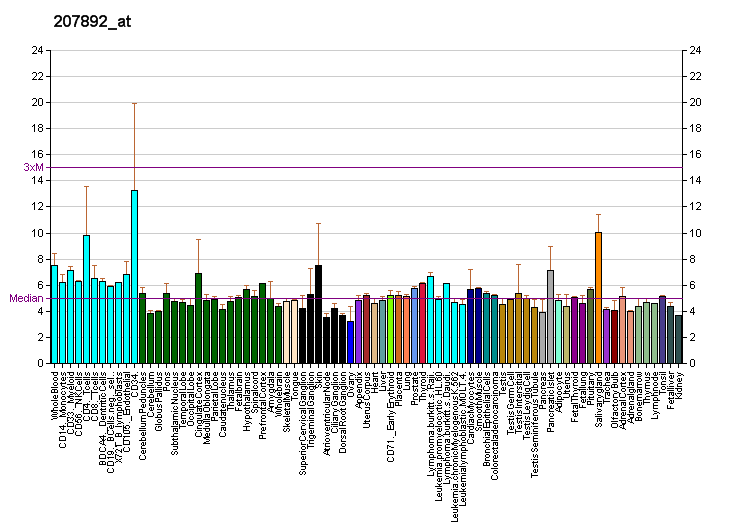
RNA expression pattern
Bgee	Human / Mouse (ortholog); Top expressed in: granulocyte; lymph node; blood; appendix; rectum; spleen; gallbladder; mucosa of transverse colon; bone marrow; epithelium of colon / Top expressed in: thymus; Meckel's cartilage; spleen; hip; bones of pectoral girdle; shoulder; humerus; right kidney; scapula; jejunum; More reference expression data
BioGPS	More reference expression data
Gene ontology
Molecular function	cytokine activity; CD40 receptor binding; tumor necrosis factor receptor binding; protein binding
Cellular component	integral component of membrane; membrane; plasma membrane; integral component of plasma membrane; extracellular region; external side of plasma membrane; intracellular anatomical structure; cell surface; extracellular space
Biological process	leukocyte cell-cell adhesion; positive regulation of interleukin-12 production; negative regulation of apoptotic process; tumor necrosis factor-mediated signaling pathway; platelet activation; positive regulation of endothelial cell apoptotic process; B cell proliferation; isotype switching; immune response; regulation of immune response; B cell differentiation; inflammatory response; T cell costimulation; positive regulation of NF-kappaB transcription factor activity; positive regulation of interleukin-4 production; positive regulation of interleukin-10 production; positive regulation of T cell proliferation; regulation of signaling receptor activity
Sources:Amigo / QuickGO
Orthologs
Databases	NCBI: entry; OMA: entry
Species	Human	Mouse
Entrez	959	21947
Ensembl	ENSG00000102245	ENSMUSG00000031132
UniProt	P29965	P27548
RefSeq (mRNA)	NM_000074	NM_011616
RefSeq (protein)	NP_000065	NP_035746
Location (UCSC)	Chr X: 136.65 – 136.66 Mb	Chr X: 56.26 – 56.27 Mb
PubMed search
- Wikidata
View/Edit Human	View/Edit Mouse

CD40 ligand (CD40-L), also commonly called CD154, is a protein that in humans is encoded by the CD40LG gene. CD40-L is primarily expressed on activated T cells and is a member of the TNF superfamily of molecules. It binds to CD40 on antigen-presenting cells (APC), which leads to many effects depending on the target cell type. In total CD40L has three binding partners: CD40, α5β1 integrin and integrin αIIbβ3. CD154 acts as a costimulatory molecule and is particularly important on a subset of T cells called T follicular helper cells (T_{FH} cells). On T_{FH} cells, CD154 promotes B cell maturation and function by engaging CD40 on the B cell surface and therefore facilitating cell-cell communication. A defect in this gene results in an inability to undergo immunoglobulin class switching and is associated with hyper IgM syndrome. Absence of CD154 also stops the formation of germinal centers and therefore prohibits antibody affinity maturation, an important process in the adaptive immune system.

== History ==
In 1991, three groups reported discovering CD154. Seth Lederman, Michael Yellin, and Leonard Chess at Columbia University generated a murine monoclonal antibody, 5c8, that inhibited contact-dependent T cell helper function in human cells and which characterized a 32 kDa surface protein transiently expressed on activated CD4+ T cells. Richard Armitage at Immunex cloned a cDNA encoding CD154 by screening an expression library with CD40-Ig. Randolph Noelle at Dartmouth Medical School generated an antibody that bound a 39 kDa protein on murine T cells and inhibited helper function. Noelle contested Lederman's patent, but the challenge (called an interference) was rejected on all counts

== Expression ==
CD40 ligand (CD154) is primarily expressed on activated CD4+ T lymphocytes but is also found in a soluble form. While CD40L was originally described on T lymphocytes, its expression has since been found on a wide variety of cells, including platelets, mast cells, macrophages, basophils, NK cells, B lymphocytes, as well as non-haematopoietic cells (smooth muscle cells, endothelial cells, and epithelial cells).

== Specific effects on cells ==
CD40L plays a central role in costimulation and regulation of the immune response via T cell priming and activation of CD40-expressing immune cells. At least 46 disease-causing mutations in this gene have been discovered.

=== Macrophages ===
In the macrophage, the primary signal for activation is IFN-γ from Th1 type CD4 T cells. The secondary signal is CD40L on the T cell, which binds CD40 on the macrophage cell surface. As a result, the macrophage expresses more CD40 and TNF receptors on its surface, which helps increase the level of activation. The activated macrophage can then destroy phagocytosed bacteria and produce more cytokines.

=== B cells ===
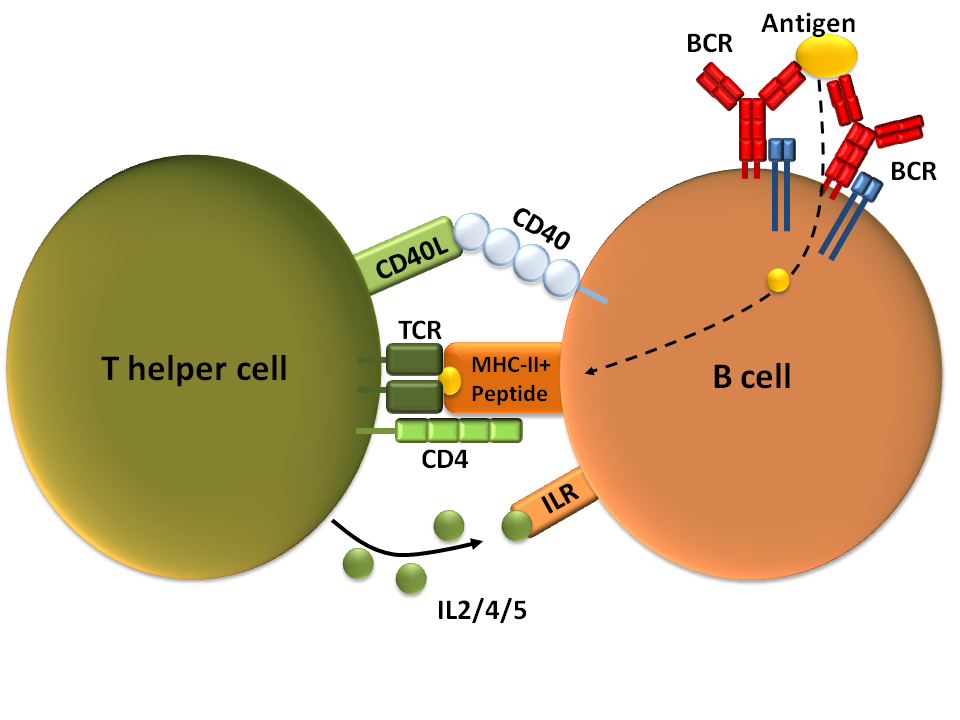
T cell-dependent B cell activation, showing a TH2-cell (left), B cell (right), and several interaction molecules, the TH2-cell expressing CD40L.

B cells can present antigens to a specialized group of helper T cells called T_{FH} cells. If an activated T_{FH} cell recognizes the peptide presented by the B cell, the CD40L on the T cell binds to the B cell's CD40, causing B cell activation. The T cell also produces IL-4, which directly influences B cells. As a result of this stimulation, the B cell can undergo rapid cellular division to form a germinal center where antibody isotype switching and affinity maturation occurs, as well as their differentiation to plasma cells and memory B cells. The end-result is a B cell that is able to mass-produce specific antibodies against an antigenic target. Early evidence for these effects were that in CD40 or CD154 deficient mice, there is little class switching or germinal centre formation, and immune responses are severely inhibited.

=== Endothelial cells ===
Activation of endothelial cells by CD40L (e.g. from activated platelets) leads to reactive oxygen species production, as well as chemokine and cytokine production, and expression of adhesion molecules such as E-selectin, ICAM-1, and VCAM-1. This inflammatory reaction in endothelial cells promotes recruitment of leukocytes to lesions and may potentially promote atherogenesis. CD40L has shown to be a potential biomarker for atherosclerotic instability.

== Interactions ==
CD154 has been shown to interact with RNF128 and RACK1.
