= BCL6 =

Transcription factor for converting Naive T cells to TFH

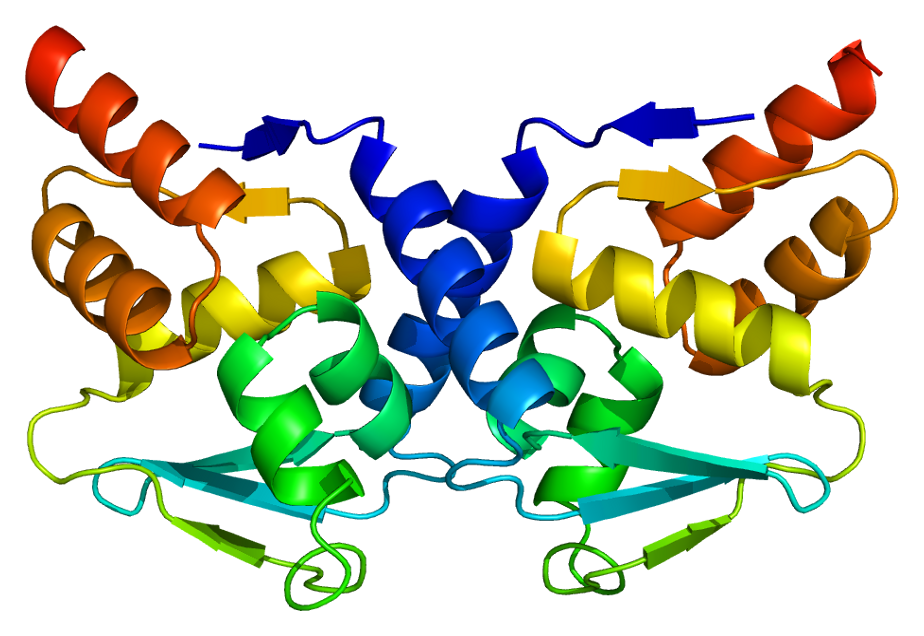

Identifiers
- Aliases: BCL6, BCL5, BCL6A, LAZ3, ZBTB27, ZNF51, B-cell CLL/lymphoma 6, B cell CLL/lymphoma 6, transcription repressor, BCL6 transcription repressor
- External IDs: OMIM: 109565; MGI: 107187; GeneCards: BCL6
Available structures
PDB	Ortholog search: PDBe RCSB
PDB	List of PDB id codes 1R28, 1R29, 1R2B, 2EN2, 2EOS, 2LCE, 2YRM, 3BIM, 3E4U, 3LBZ, 4CP3, 4U2M

Gene location (Human)
Chr.	Chromosome 3 (human)
Band	3q27.3	Start	187,721,377 bp
Band	3q27.3	End	187,745,725 bp

Gene location (Mouse)
Chr.	Chromosome 16 (mouse)
Band	16 B1|16 15.26 cM	Start	23,783,802 bp
Band	16 B1|16 15.26 cM	End	23,807,602 bp
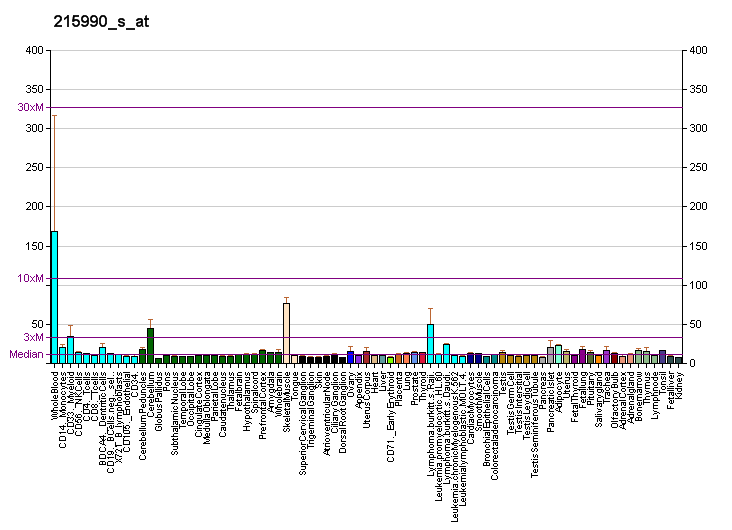

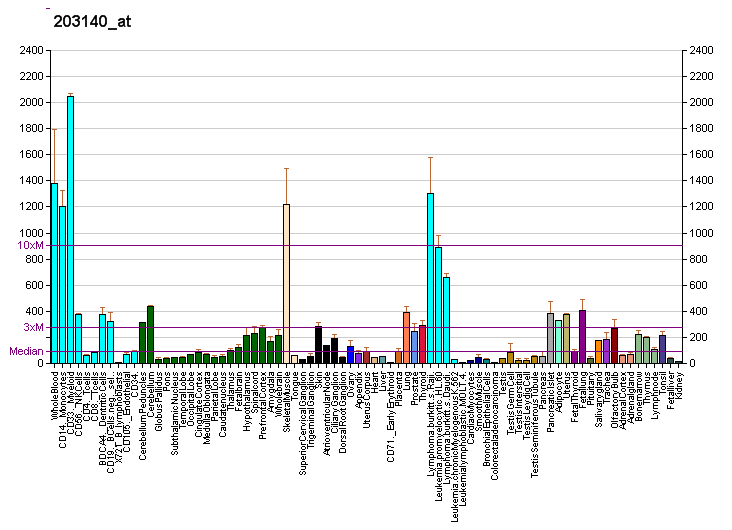
RNA expression pattern
Bgee	Human / Mouse (ortholog); Top expressed in: gastrocnemius muscle; gastric mucosa; blood; left uterine tube; Skeletal muscle tissue of rectus abdominis; pericardium; right lung; skin of thigh; glutes; bronchial epithelial cell / Top expressed in: facial motor nucleus; granulocyte; extensor digitorum longus muscle; masseter muscle; intercostal muscle; triceps brachii muscle; ciliary body; ankle; plantaris muscle; motor neuron; More reference expression data
BioGPS	More reference expression data
Gene ontology
Molecular function	sequence-specific DNA binding; DNA binding; RNA polymerase II transcription regulatory region sequence-specific DNA binding; DNA-binding transcription factor activity; intronic transcription regulatory region sequence-specific DNA binding; chromatin binding; metal ion binding; protein binding; DNA-binding transcription repressor activity, RNA polymerase II-specific; nucleic acid binding; chromatin DNA binding; identical protein binding; DNA-binding transcription factor activity, RNA polymerase II-specific
Cellular component	replication fork; nucleus; nucleoplasm; Golgi apparatus
Biological process	regulation of germinal center formation; positive regulation of histone deacetylation; negative regulation of T-helper 2 cell differentiation; protein localization; negative regulation of mast cell cytokine production; regulation of transcription, DNA-templated; immune system process; regulation of GTPase activity; regulation of transcription by RNA polymerase II; negative regulation of cell differentiation; germinal center formation; negative regulation of Rho protein signal transduction; negative regulation of isotype switching to IgE isotypes; negative regulation of apoptotic process; negative regulation of transcription by RNA polymerase II; transcription, DNA-templated; type 2 immune response; cellular response to DNA damage stimulus; negative regulation of cell-matrix adhesion; regulation of cell population proliferation; positive regulation of B cell proliferation; negative regulation of cell growth; Rho protein signal transduction; cell morphogenesis; spermatogenesis; regulation of memory T cell differentiation; positive regulation of neuron differentiation; regulation of inflammatory response; regulation of immune response; positive regulation of apoptotic process; negative regulation of type 2 immune response; negative regulation of B cell apoptotic process; B cell differentiation; inflammatory response; negative regulation of transcription, DNA-templated; actin cytoskeleton organization; negative regulation of cell population proliferation; negative regulation of Notch signaling pathway; erythrocyte development; negative regulation of cellular senescence; regulation of apoptotic process; negative regulation of mitotic cell cycle DNA replication; positive regulation of regulatory T cell differentiation; cytokine-mediated signaling pathway
Sources:Amigo / QuickGO
Orthologs
Databases	NCBI: entry; OMA: entry
Species	Human	Mouse
Entrez	604	12053
Ensembl	ENSG00000113916	ENSMUSG00000022508
UniProt	P41182	P41183
RefSeq (mRNA)	NM_001130845; NM_001134738; NM_001706; NM_138931	NM_009744; NM_001348026
RefSeq (protein)	NP_001124317; NP_001128210; NP_001697	NP_001334955; NP_033874
Location (UCSC)	Chr 3: 187.72 – 187.75 Mb	Chr 16: 23.78 – 23.81 Mb
PubMed search
- Wikidata
View/Edit Human	View/Edit Mouse

Bcl-6 (B-cell lymphoma 6) is a protein that in humans is encoded by the BCL6 gene. BCL6 is a master transcription factor for regulation of T follicular helper cells (T_{FH} cells) proliferation. BCL6 has three evolutionary conserved structural domains. The interaction of these domains with corepressors allows for germinal center development and leads to B cell proliferation.

The deletion of BCL6 is known to lead to failure of germinal center formation in the follicles of the lymph nodes, preventing B cells from undergoing somatic hypermutation. Mutations in BCL6 can lead to B cell lymphomas because it promotes unchecked B cell growth. Clinically, BCL6 can be used to diagnose B cell lymphomas and is shown to be upregulated in a number of cancers.

Other BCL genes, including BCL2, BCL3, BCL5, BCL7A, BCL9, and BCL10, also have clinical significance in lymphoma.

== Normal physiological function ==
=== Structure ===
The protein encoded by the BCL6 gene is a zinc finger transcription factor that has three evolutionarily conserved domains. BCL6 contains a (1) N-terminal BTB/POZ domain (Broad-complex, Tramtrack and Brick-a-brac/Pox virus and Zinc finger family domain), (2) a central RN2 region, and (3) another zinc finger at the C-terminal end. This structure is vital to BCL6’s function – an exon 7 skipping splice variant encodes a shorter form of the protein which lacks the first two zinc fingers of the DNA binding domain, for example.

=== Function ===
Bcl-6 is a master transcription factor for the regulation of T follicular helper cells (T_{FH} cells). Bcl-6 is expressed when the cytokines Il-6 and/or Il-21 are recognized; these cytokines can be produced by antigen presenting cells (APCs: B cells, dendritic cells, or macrophages) when activated. This occurs when a naïve T helper cell recognizes antigen and needs to migrate to the follicle as a T follicular helper cell (T_{FH} cell). T_{FH} cells are vital to the generation of germinal centers in the follicles of secondary lymphoid organs, where B cells divide and help fight infections.

As a master transcription factor, BCL6 interacts with a variety of co-repressors and other proteins to influence the T cell lineage. BCL6 has been shown to modulate the STAT-dependent Interleukin 4 (IL-4) responses of B cells and suppress the production of BCL2.

Importantly, Bcl-6 should only be expressed when there is an antigen present and further stimulation of the immune system is necessary, since BCL6 prevents cell death (apoptosis). Unchecked growth can lead to lymphomas. Normally, the action of BCL6 is negatively regulated by the gene PRDM1 encoding the transcription factor Blimp-1. The antagonistic effect with Blimp-1 is a powerful role of BCL6, because it shuts off the normal pathway of differentiation toward other cell types.

== Differentiation of T_{FH} Cells ==
BCL6 is currently considered a lineage-defining transcription factor in T_{FH} cell differentiation. Without the expression of BCL6, naïve CD4+ T helper cells will not turn into T_{FH} cells. When a naïve CD4+ T cell binds to MHC class II and an antigen peptide on a dendritic cell, a signaling cascade ensues in which some proliferating T cells become T_{FH} cells. Signaling through the IL-6 receptor leads to T_{FH} cell differentiation, and in turn the expression of BCL6 in T_{FH} lineage-defined cells. BCL6 allows, through transcriptional regulation, unique cell markers to be expressed, resulting in an effective T_{FH} cell.

Transcriptional regulation of BCL6 is vast and complex, but many of the outcomes of BCL6’s transcriptional regulation on T_{FH} cells have been elucidated. T_{FH} cells upregulate CXCR5, IL-6R, and ICOS during their migration to the germinal center. After interacting with a B cell presenting the cognate antigen in the follicle, they also upregulate SAP^{hi}, CD200^{hi} and BTLA^{hi} on their cell surface in the newly formed germinal center. Additionally, BCL6 directly binds and suppresses genes that are downregulated in non-T_{FH} cells, including Ccr7, Selplg, and Gpr183, and other chemokine receptor targets.

== Clinical Value ==
=== Role in B Cell Lymphomas ===
BCL6 is found to be frequently translocated and hypermutated in diffuse large B cell lymphoma (DLBCL) and contributes to the pathogenesis of DLBCL. BCL6 is exclusively present in the B-cells of both healthy and neoplastic (cancerous) germinal centers. This allows lymphoma’s to be diagnosed based on immunohistochemical staining, revealing the presence of Burkitt's lymphoma, follicular lymphoma and the nodular lymphocyte predominant subtype of Hodgkin's disease. It is often used together with antibodies to Bcl-2 antigen to distinguish neoplastic follicles from those found in benign hyperplasia, for which Bcl-2 is negative.

Many different changes to BCL6 can lead to inhibited activity and are known to be linked with B-cell lymphomas, including direct effects (mutation and post-translational effects) as well as indirect effects (imbalanced interactions with other mutated proteins). Mutations to the transcription factors for BCL6, MEF2B and IRF8, are common in direct transcriptional changes that cause DLBCL. Additionally, post-translational phosphorylation can be affected by mutations in FBXO11. Finally, BCL6’s interaction with other mutated proteins, including CREBBP, EP300, EZH2, and KM2TD, can also lead to B-cell lymphomas. Given its role as a master transcription regulator, many genetic and epigenetic changes can be responsible for B-cell lymphomas; these interacting proteins are likely a few of many that affect BCL6’s function.

=== Diagnostic Ability ===
Tracking BCL6 in B cells using immunohistochemical staining or enzyme-linked immunosorbent assay (ELISA) can be used to diagnose cancers and may indicate other illnesses as well. As mentioned previously, tracking BCL6 in tandem with BCL2 can lead to the diagnosis of B-cell lymphomas. More recently, it has been hypothesized that the presence of BCL6 in serum could be used to diagnose endometriosis due to an overactivation of BCL6 in endometriotic females, although this diagnostic method has not been found to work. Nonetheless, the understanding of BCL6 will likely continue to be used to diagnose diseases.

=== Targeted Therapies ===
Given BCL6’s role in B-cell lymphomas, it has been suggested as a therapeutic target for cancer treatment. Targeting BCL6 in cancer patients should lead to the deletion of BCL6 in tumor cells. Peptidomimetics, small molecules, and natural compounds have been developed and tested in preclinical models, showing promise of anti-lymphoma activity.

== Interactions ==
BCL6 has been shown to interact with

* BCOR,
- BTLA,
- Ccr7,
- CD200,
- C-jun,
- CREBBP,
- CXCR5,
- EP300,
- EZH2,
- Gpr183,
- HDAC1,
- HDAC4,
- HDAC7A,
- HDAC5,
- ICOS,
- IRF8,
- IRF4,
- IL-6R,
- KM2TD,
- MET2B,
- NCOR2
- NCOR2,
- SAP,
- Selplg,
- SMRT,
- ZBTB7A
- T-bet,
- ZBTB16

== See also ==
- Nodular lymphocyte predominant Hodgkin's lymphoma
- Diffuse large B cell lymphoma
