= Follicular dendritic cells =

Immune cells found in lymph nodes

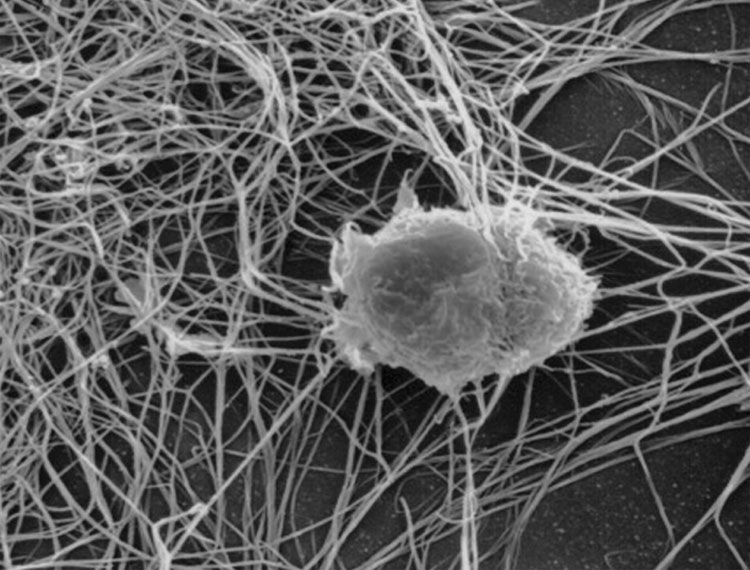
This is an isolated Follicular Dendritic Cell cultured on collagen. It shows a cell body and numerous dendritic cell processes interdigitating with one another and with dendrites of adjacent FDCs to form a network. This network traps antigen in the form of immune complexes and helps initiate an antibody response by B cells

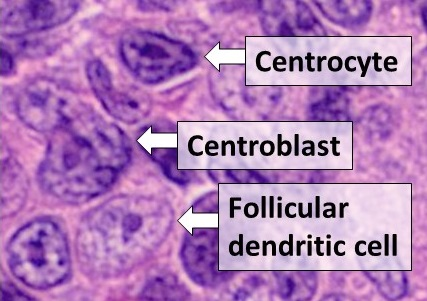
Histologic comparison of cell types in a germinal center, H&E stain: Centrocytes are small to medium size with angulated, elongated, cleaved, or twisted nuclei.; Centroblasts are larger cells containing vesicular nuclei with one to three basophilic nucleoli apposing the nuclear membrane.; Follicular dendritic cells have round nuclei, centrally located nucleoli, bland and dispersed chromatin, and flattening of adjacent nuclear membrane.

Follicular dendritic cells (FDC) are cells of the immune system found in primary and secondary lymph follicles (lymph nodes) of the B cell areas of the lymphoid tissue. Unlike dendritic cells (DC), FDCs are not derived from the bone-marrow hematopoietic stem cell, but are of mesenchymal origin. Possible functions of FDC include: organizing lymphoid tissue's cells and microarchitecture, capturing antigen to support B cell, promoting debris removal from germinal centers, and protecting against autoimmunity. Disease processes that FDC may contribute include primary FDC-tumor, chronic inflammatory conditions, HIV-1 infection development, and neuroinvasive scrapie.

== Location and molecular markers ==
Follicular DCs are a non-migratory population found in primary and secondary follicles of the B cell areas of lymph nodes, spleen, and mucosa-associated lymphoid tissue (MALT). They form a stable network due to intercellular connections between FDC processes and intimate interaction with follicular B cells. Follicular DCs network typically forms the center of the follicle and does not extend from the follicle to the interfollicular regions or T-cell zone. Supposedly, this separation from the sites of earliest antigen processing and capture provide a protected environment in which opsonized antigens can be displayed for a long time without being proteolyzed or removed by phagocytic cells. Follicular DCs have high expression of complement receptors CR1 and CR2 (CD 35 and CD 21 respectively) and Fc-receptor FcγRIIb (CD32). Further FDCs specific molecular markers are FDC-M1, FDC-M2 and C4. Unlike other DCs and macrophages, FDCs lack MHC class II antigen molecules and express few pattern-recognition receptors, so they have little ability to capture non-opsonized antigens.

== Development ==
Follicular DCs develop from putative mesenchymal precursors. Severe combined immunodeficiency (SCID) mice models demonstrate that these precursors may be transmitted to recipients with bone marrow allotransplants, in which case both donors' and recipients' FDCs networks may later be found in recipients' lymphoid compartments. Interaction between FDCs precursors and lymphoid cells mediated by TNF-a and lymphotoxin (LT) is crucial for normal FDC development and maintenance. TNF-a binds on the TNFRI receptor, while LT interacts with LTβ-receptor expressed on FDC precursors. In mice lacking B cells, or with blocked TNF-a and lymphotoxin (LT) production, cells with FDC phenotype are missing.

== Functions ==
=== Organizing lymphoid microarchitecture ===
In normal lymphoid tissue, recirculating resting B cells migrate through the FDC networks, whereas antigen-activated B cells are intercepted and undergo clonal expansion within the FDC networks, generating germinal centers (GC). FDCs are among main producers of the chemokine CXCL13 which attracts and organises lymphoid cells.

=== Antigen capturing, memory B-cell support ===
Follicular DCs receptors CR1, CR2 and FcγRIIb trap antigen opsonized by complement or antibodies. These antigens are then taken up in a non-degradative cycling endosomal compartment for later presentation to B cells. To become selected as a future memory cell, GC B cells must bind the antigen presented on FDCs, otherwise they enter apoptosis.

=== Debris removal ===
By secreting the bridging factor MFGE8, which crosslinks apoptotic cells and phagocytes, FDCs promote selective debris removal from the GC.

=== Preventing autoimmunity ===
Factor Mfge produced in lymphoid tissues mainly by FDCs is known to enhance engulfment of apoptotic cells. Deficit of this factor in mice leads to a state resembling systemic lupus erythematosus (SLE). Furthermore, mice lacking LT or LT receptors, which are devoid of FDC, develop generalized lymphocytic infiltrates, which are suggestive of autoimmunity. These findings suggest that FDC possibly protect organism against autoimmunity by the removal of potentially self-reactive debris from germinal centres.

== Interaction with B-cells ==
Noncognate (not antigen specific) B cells play a significant role in the transport of antigens to FDCs. They capture immune complexes in CR1/2-dependent way either directly from the lymph or from macrophages, and move to the lymphoid tissue, where they transfer complement opsonized antigen to the FDCs.

FDCs, in turn, attract B cells with chemoattractant CXCL13. B cells lacking CXCR5, the receptor for CXCL13, still enter the white pulp, but are mislocalized and disorganized. To generate follicular structures, FDCs need to be stimulated by lymphotoxin (LT), a mediator produced by B cells. The stimulation of CXCR5 on B cells upregulates LT production, which leads to FDCs activation and stimulates further CXCL13 secretion, thus generating a positive feed-forward loop. This results in the formation of germinal centers (GCs), where antigen-activated B cells are trapped to undergo somatic mutation, positive and negative selection, isotype switching, and differentiation into high-affinity plasma cells and memory B cells. Adhesion between FDCs and B cells is mediated by ICAM-1 (CD54)–LFA-1 (CD11a) and VCAM–VLA-4 molecules. Activated B-cells with low affinity to antigen captured on FDCs surface as well as autoreactive B-cells undergo apoptosis, whereas B cells bound to FDCs through the antigen complex, survive due to apoptosis blockage caused by interaction with FDCs.

== Diseases ==
Rare primary FDC-tumors have been described. These sarcomas often involve lymphoid tissues, but in a number of cases the tumor has been found in the liver, bile duct, pancreas, thyroid, nasopharynx, palatum, submucosa of the stomach or the duodenum. In a number of chronic inflammatory conditions, cells producing CXCL13 chemokine and carrying such FDCs markers as VCAM-1 and CD21, have been observed at quite unexpected sites, including synovial tissue of patients with rheumatoid arthritis (RA), salivary glands of patients with Sjögren's syndrome, and the skin of patients with pseudo B cells lymphoma. Follicular dendritic cells participate in HIV-1 infection development both, by providing a haven for HIV-1 and by stimulating HIV-1 replication in adjacent infected monocytic cells via a juxtacrine signaling mechanism. There is also some evidence, that FDCs may promote prion replication and neuroinvasion in neuroinvasive scrapie.

== See also ==
- Follicular+Dendritic+Cells at the U.S. National Library of Medicine Medical Subject Headings (MeSH)
