= Affinity maturation =

Cellular process in B cells

In immunology, affinity maturation is the process by which T_{FH} cell-activated B cells produce antibodies with increased affinity for antigen during the course of an immune response. With repeated exposures to the same antigen, a host will produce antibodies of successively greater affinities. A secondary response can elicit antibodies with several fold greater affinity than in a primary response. Affinity maturation primarily occurs on membrane immunoglobulin of germinal center B cells and as a direct result of somatic hypermutation (SHM) and selection by T_{FH} cells.

Affinity maturation also occurs when GC B cells encounter antigens related to the original antigen they were raised against, as long as some binding capabilities remain against the new variant antigen. Over many rounds of maturation against new variants, GC B cells could (very rarely) end up producing broadly-neutralizing antibodies that bind the common (conserved) part of these antigens. One ideal in the field of vaccination is to reliably replicate this process so as to immunize against a broad spectrum of related pathogens.

== In vivo ==
The process is thought to involve two interrelated processes, occurring in the germinal centers of the secondary lymphoid organs:

1. Somatic hypermutation: Mutations in the variable, antigen-binding coding sequences (known as complementarity-determining regions (CDR)) of the immunoglobulin genes. The mutation rate is up to 1,000,000 times higher than in cell lines outside the lymphoid system. Although the exact mechanism of the SHM is still not known, a major role for the activation-induced (cytidine) deaminase has been discussed. The increased mutation rate results in 1-2 mutations per CDR and, hence, per cell generation. The mutations alter the binding specificity and binding affinities of the resultant antibodies.
2. Clonal selection: B cells that have undergone SHM must compete for limiting growth resources, including the availability of antigen and paracrine signals from T_{FH} cells. The follicular dendritic cells (FDCs) of the germinal centers present antigen to the B cells, and the B cell progeny with the highest affinities for antigen, having gained a competitive advantage, are favored for positive selection leading to their survival. Positive selection is based on steady cross-talk between T_{FH} cells and their cognate antigen presenting GC B cell. Because a limited number of T_{FH} cells reside in the germinal center, only highly competitive B cells stably conjugate with T_{FH} cells and thus receive T cell-dependent survival signals. B cell progeny that have undergone SHM, but bind antigen with lower affinity will be out-competed, and be deleted. Over several rounds of selection, the resultant secreted antibodies produced will have effectively increased affinities for antigen.

== In vitro ==
Like the natural prototype, the in vitro affinity maturation is based on the principles of mutation and selection. The in vitro affinity maturation has successfully been used to optimize antibodies, antibody fragments or other peptide molecules like antibody mimetics. Random mutations inside the CDRs are introduced using radiation, chemical mutagens or error-prone PCR. In addition, the genetic diversity can be increased by chain shuffling. Two or three rounds of mutation and selection using display methods like phage display usually results in antibody fragments with affinities in the low nanomolar range.
