= Plasma cell =

White blood cell that secretes large volumes of antibodies

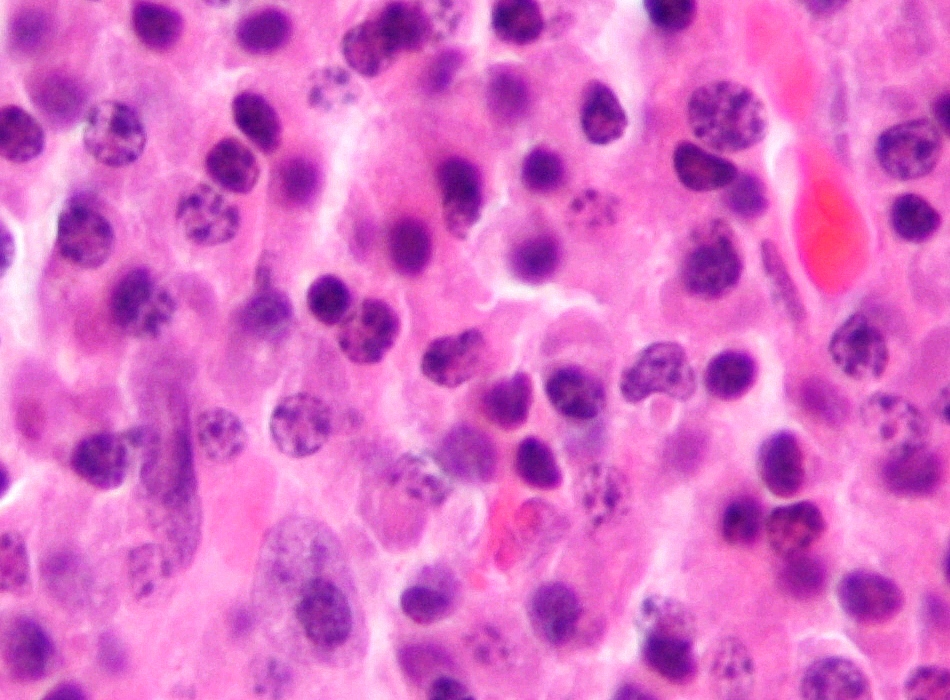
- Micrograph of malignant plasma cells (plasmacytoma), many displaying characteristic "clockface nuclei", also seen in normal plasma cells. H&E stain.

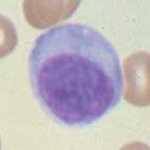
- Micrograph of a plasma cell with distinct clear perinuclear region of the cytoplasm, which contains large numbers of Golgi bodies.

Details
- System: Lymphatic system

Identifiers
- Latin: plasmocytus
- MeSH: D010950
- TH: H2.00.03.0.01006
- FMA: 70574

Plasma cells, also called plasma B cells or effector B cells, are white blood cells that originate in the lymphoid organs as B cells and secrete large quantities of proteins called antibodies in response to being presented with specific substances called antigens. These antibodies are transported from the plasma cells by the blood plasma and the lymphatic system to the site of the target antigen (foreign substance), where they initiate its neutralization or destruction. B cells differentiate into plasma cells that produce antibody molecules closely modeled after the receptors of the precursor B cell.

== Structure ==
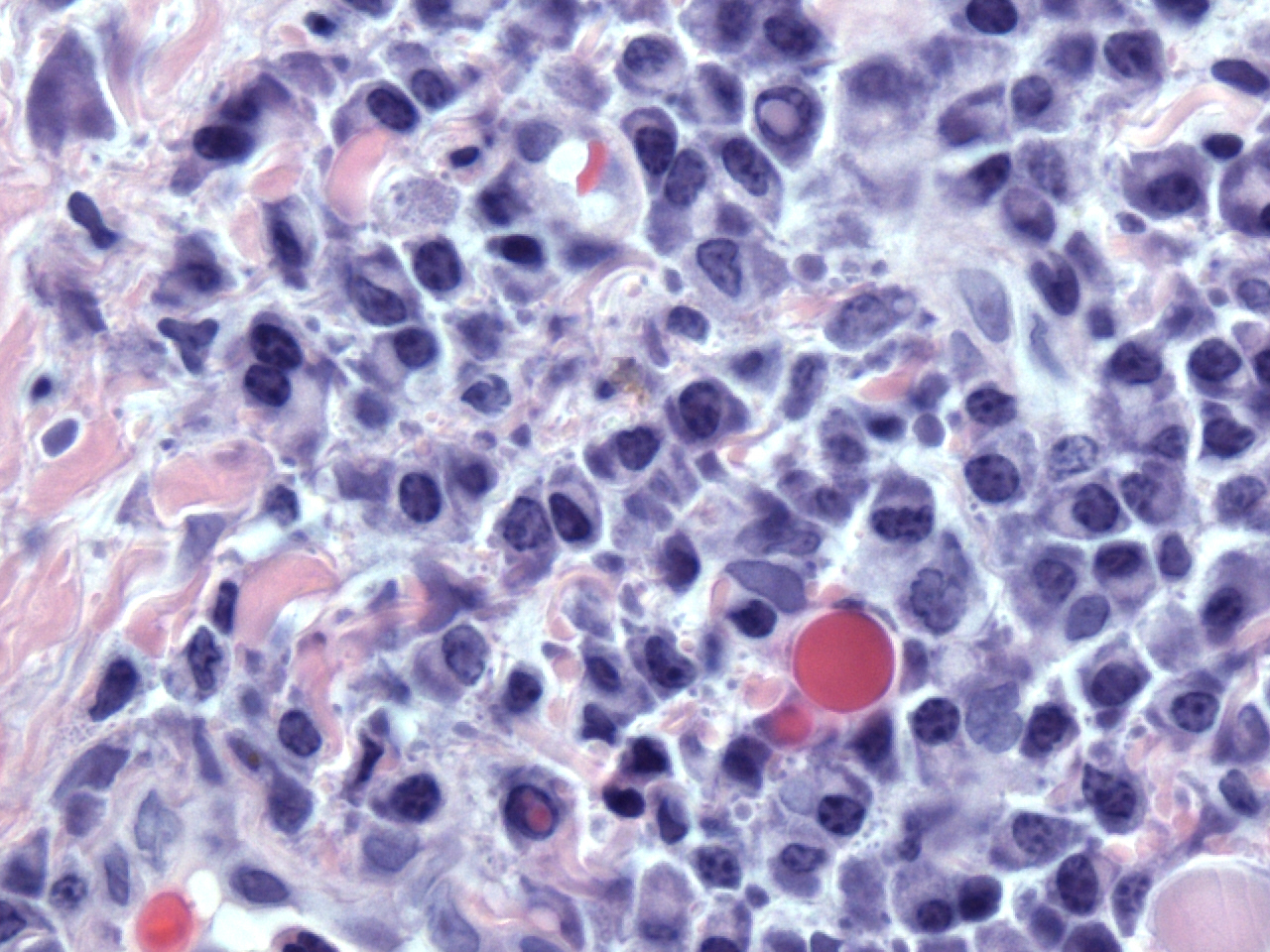
Plasma cells with Dutcher and Russell bodies (H&E stain, 100×, oil)

Plasma cells are large lymphocytes with abundant cytoplasm and a characteristic appearance on light microscopy. They have basophilic cytoplasm and an eccentric nucleus with heterochromatin in a characteristic cartwheel or clock face arrangement. Their cytoplasm also contains a pale zone, where electron microscopy reveals an extensive Golgi apparatus and centrioles. Abundant rough endoplasmic reticulum combined with a well-developed Golgi apparatus makes plasma cells well-suited for secreting immunoglobulins.

=== Surface antigens ===
Terminally differentiated plasma cells express relatively few surface antigens, and do not express common pan-B cell markers, such as CD19 and CD20. Instead, plasma cells are identified through flow cytometry by their additional expression of CD138, CD78, and the Interleukin-6 receptor. In humans, CD27 is a good marker for plasma cells; naïve B cells are CD27−, memory B-cells are CD27+ and plasma cells are CD27++.

Immunohistochemistry for CD138 (syndecan-1) showing plasma cells in a case of chronic deciduitis, showing membranous staining.

The surface antigen CD138 (syndecan-1) is expressed at high levels. On immunohistochemistry (IHC), staining in plasma cells is primarily membranous, but the rim can look discontinuous or granular, and some cells also show cytoplasmic or Golgi staining.

Another important surface antigen is CD319 (SLAMF7). This antigen is expressed at high levels on normal human plasma cells. It is also expressed on malignant plasma cells in multiple myeloma. Compared with CD138, which disappears rapidly ex vivo, the expression of CD319 is considerably more stable.

== Development ==
After leaving the bone marrow, the B cell acts as an antigen-presenting cell (APC) and internalizes offending antigens, which are taken up by the B cell through receptor-mediated endocytosis and processed. Pieces of the antigen (which are now known as antigenic peptides) are loaded onto MHC II molecules, and presented on its extracellular surface to CD4+ T cells (sometimes called T helper cells). These T cells bind to the MHC II-antigen molecule and cause activation of the B cell. This is a type of safeguard to the system, similar to a two-factor authentication method. First, the B cells must encounter a foreign antigen and are then required to be activated by T helper cells before they differentiate into specific cells.

Upon stimulation by a T cell, which usually occurs in germinal centers of secondary lymphoid organs such as the spleen and lymph nodes, the activated B cell begins to differentiate into more specialized cells. Germinal center B cells may differentiate into memory B cells or plasma cells. Most of these B cells will become plasmablasts (or "immature plasma cells"), and eventually plasma cells, and begin producing large volumes of antibodies. Some B cells will undergo a process known as affinity maturation. This process favors, by selection for the ability to bind antigen with higher affinity, the activation and growth of B cell clones able to secrete antibodies of higher affinity for the antigen.

=== Immature plasma cells ===
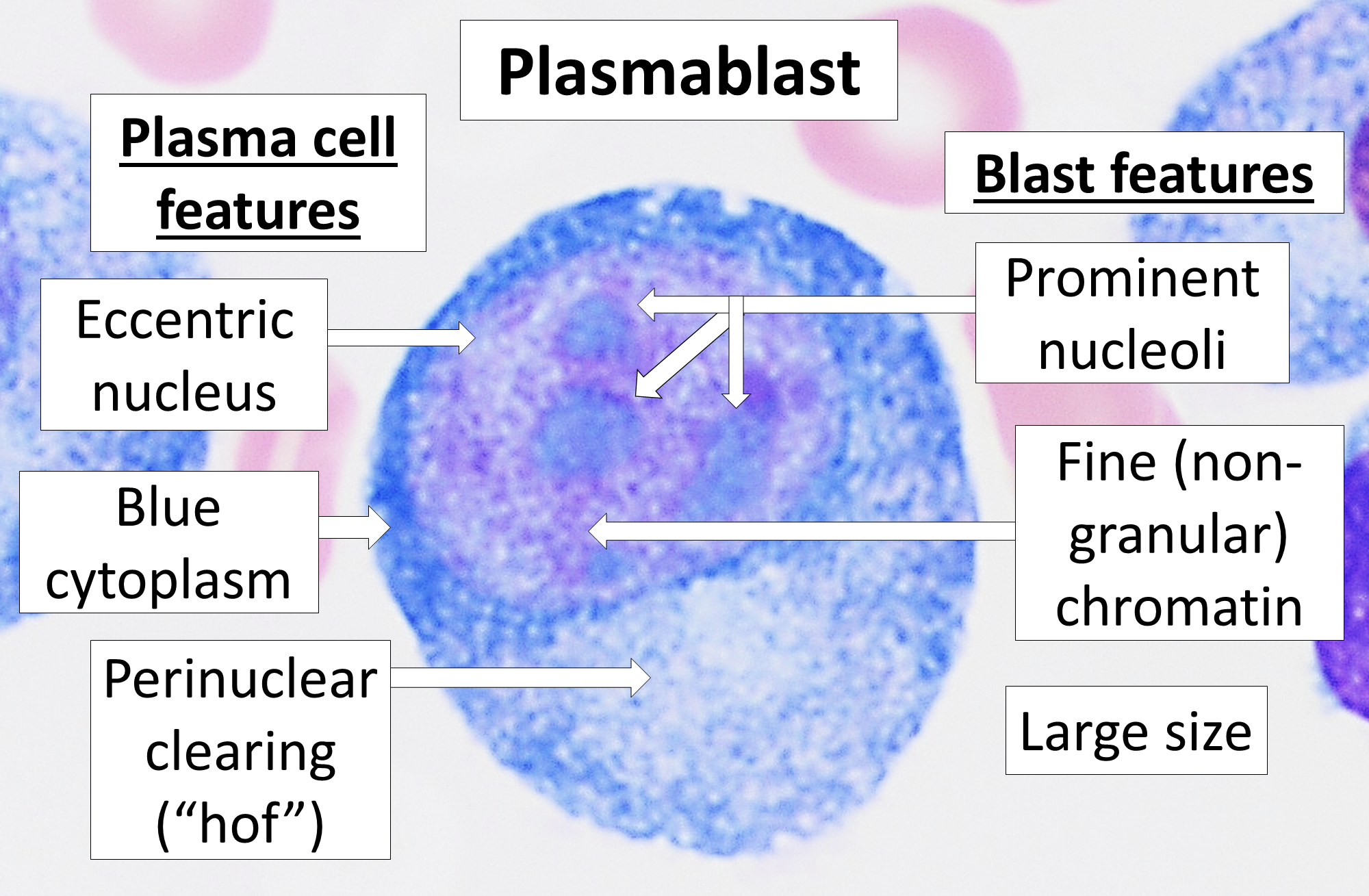
Plasmablast, Wright stain.

The most immature blood cell that is considered of plasma cell lineage is the plasmablast. Plasmablasts secrete more antibodies than B cells, but less than plasma cells. They divide rapidly and are still capable of internalizing antigens and presenting them to T cells. A cell may stay in this state for several days, and then either die or irrevocably differentiate into a mature, fully differentiated plasma cell. Differentiation of mature B cells into plasma cells is dependent upon the transcription factors Blimp-1/PRDM1, BCL6, and IRF4.

== Function ==
Unlike their precursors, plasma cells cannot switch antibody classes, cannot act as antigen-presenting cells because they no longer display MHC-II, and do not take up antigen because they no longer display significant quantities of immunoglobulin on the cell surface. However, continued exposure to antigen through those low levels of immunoglobulin is important, as it partly determines the cell's lifespan.

The lifespan, class of antibodies produced, and the location that the plasma cell moves to also depends on signals, such as cytokines, received from the T cell during differentiation. Differentiation through a T cell-independent antigen stimulation (stimulation of a B cell that does not require the involvement of a T cell) can happen anywhere in the body and results in short-lived cells that secrete IgM antibodies. The T cell-dependent processes are subdivided into primary and secondary responses: a primary response (meaning that the T cell is present at the time of initial contact by the B cell with the antigen) produces short-lived cells that remain in the extramedullary regions of lymph nodes; a secondary response produces longer-lived cells that produce IgG and IgA, and frequently travel to the bone marrow. For example, plasma cells will likely secrete IgG3 antibodies if they matured in the presence of the cytokine interferon-gamma. Since B cell maturation also involves somatic hypermutation (a process completed before differentiation into a plasma cell), these antibodies frequently have a very high affinity for their antigen.

Plasma cells can only produce a single kind of antibody in a single class of immunoglobulin. In other words, every B cell is specific to a single antigen, but each cell can produce several thousand matching antibodies per second. This prolific production of antibodies is an integral part of the humoral immune response.

=== Long-lived plasma cells ===
The current findings suggest that after the process of affinity maturation in germinal centers, plasma cells develop into one of two types of cells: short-lived plasma cells (SLPC) or long-lived plasma cells (LLPC). LLPC mainly reside in the bone marrow for a long period of time and secrete antibodies, thus providing long-term protection. LLPC can maintain antibody production for decades or even for the lifetime of an individual, and, unlike B cells, LLPC do not need antigen restimulation to generate antibodies. Human LLPC population can be identified as CD19^{–} CD38^{hi} CD138^{+} cells.

The long-term survival of LLPC are dependent on a specific environment in the bone marrow, the plasma cell survival niche. Removal of an LLPC from its survival niche results in its rapid death. A survival niche can only support limited number of LLPC, thus the niche's environment must protect its LLPC cells but be able to accept new arrivals. The plasma cell survival niche is defined by a combination of cellular and molecular factors and though it has yet to be properly defined, molecules such as IL-5, IL-6, TNF-α, stromal cell-derived factor-1α and signalling via CD44 have been shown to play a role in the survival of LLPC. LLPC can also be found, to a lesser degree, in gut-associated lymphoid tissue (GALT), where they produce IgA antibodies and contribute to mucosal immunity. Recent findings suggest that plasma cells in the gut do not necessarily need to be generated de novo from active B cells but there are also long-lived PC, suggesting the existence of a similar survival niche. Tissue specific niches that allow for the survival of LLPC have been also described in nasal-associated lymphoid tissues (NALT), human tonsillar lymphoid tissues and human mucosa or mucosa-associated lymphoid tissues (MALT).

Originally it was thought that the continuous production of antibodies is a result of constant replenishment of short-lived plasma cells by memory B cell re-stimulation. Recent findings, however, show that some PC are truly long-lived. The absence of antigens and the depletion of B cells does not appear to have an effect on the production of high-affinity antibodies by the LLPC. Prolonged depletion of B cells (with anti-CD20 monoclonal antibody treatment that affects B cells but not PC) also did not affect antibody titres. LLPC secrete high levels of IgG independently of B cells. LLPC in bone marrow are the main source of circulating IgG in humans. Even though IgA production is traditionally associated with mucosal sites, some plasma cells in bone marrow also produce IgA. LLPC in bone marrow have been observed producing IgM.

== Clinical significance ==
Immunohistochemistry of kappa (κ, left) and lambda (λ, right) immunoglobulin light chains in normal tonsil control tissue, with an approximate κ:λ ratio of 2:1 in the displayed fields, which is normal. An abnormal predominance of one light chain (light-chain restriction) can support a clonal B-cell or plasma-cell proliferation, including B-cell lymphoma or a plasma-cell neoplasm.

Plasmacytoma, multiple myeloma, Waldenström macroglobulinemia, heavy chain disease, and plasma cell leukemia are cancers of the plasma cells. Multiple myeloma is frequently identified because malignant plasma cells continue producing an antibody, which can be detected as a paraprotein. Monoclonal gammopathy of undetermined significance (MGUS) is a plasma cell dyscrasia characterized by the secretion of a myeloma protein into the blood and may lead to multiple myeloma.

Common variable immunodeficiency is thought to be due to a problem in the differentiation from lymphocytes to plasma cells. The result is a low serum antibody level and risk of infections.

Primary amyloidosis (AL) is caused by the deposition of excess immunoglobulin light chains which are secreted from plasma cells.

== See also ==
- Leukocyte
- Plasma cell dyscrasia
- List of distinct cell types in the adult human body
