= Somatic hypermutation =

Cellular mechanism in B cells

Somatic hypermutation (SHM) is a cellular mechanism by which the immune system adapts to the new foreign elements that confront it (e.g. microbes). A major component of the process of affinity maturation, SHM diversifies B cell receptors used to recognize foreign elements (antigens) and allows the immune system to adapt its response to new threats during the lifetime of an organism. Somatic hypermutation involves a programmed process of mutation affecting the variable regions of immunoglobulin genes. Unlike germline mutation, SHM affects only an organism's individual immune cells, and the mutations are not transmitted to the organism's offspring. Because this mechanism is merely selective and not precisely targeted, somatic hypermutation has been strongly implicated in the development of B-cell lymphomas and many other cancers.

== Targeting ==
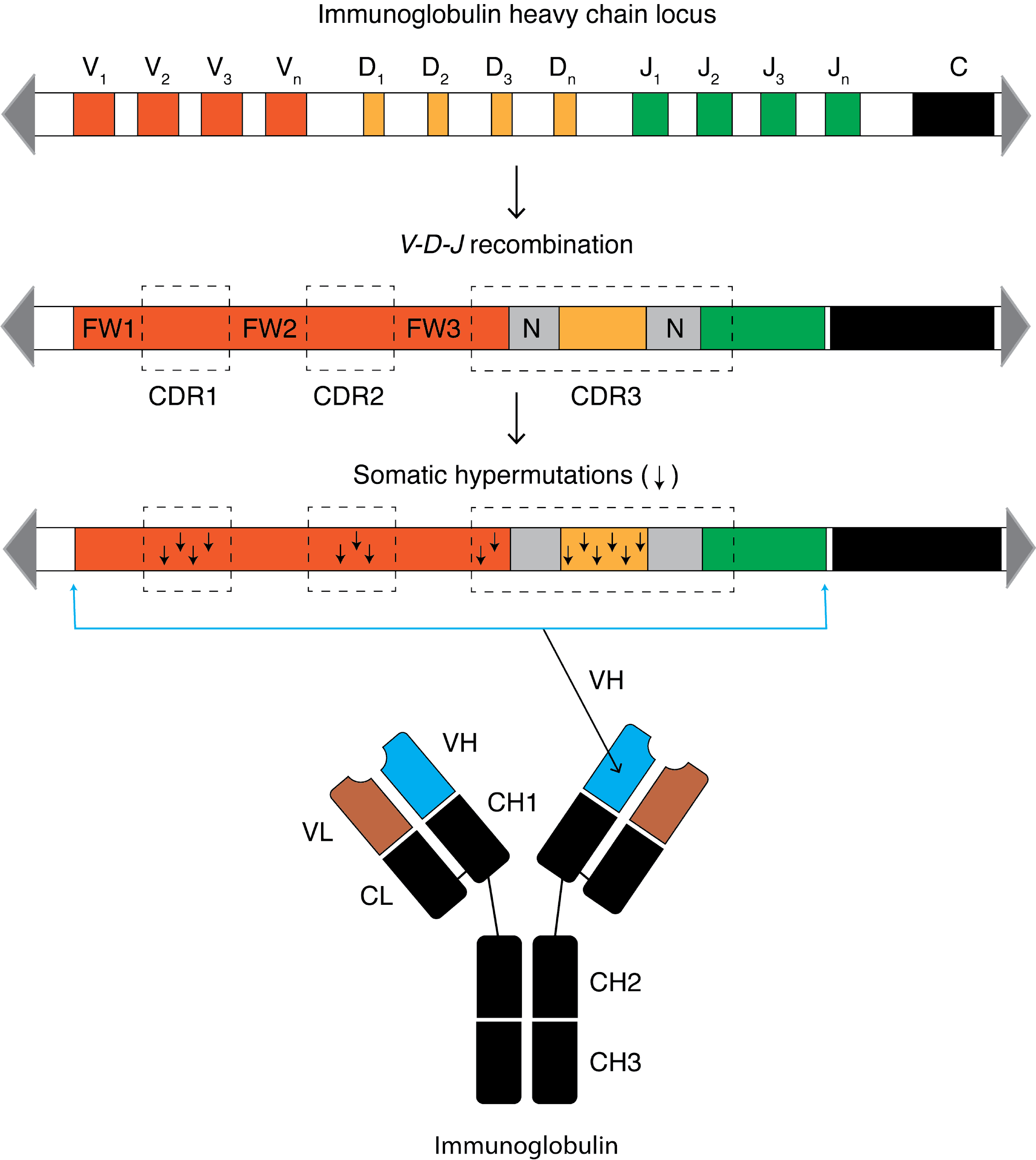
Simplistic overview of V(D)J recombination and somatic hypermutations at the immunoglobulin heavy chain variable region. Abbreviation of the regions: C = constant, D = diversity, J = joining, V = variable, L = light, H = heavy, FW = frame work, CDR = complementarity-determining regions, N = junctional diversity sequence.

When a B cell recognizes an antigen, it is stimulated to divide (or proliferate). During proliferation, the B-cell receptor locus undergoes an extremely high rate of somatic mutation that is at least 10^{5}–10^{6} fold greater than the normal rate of mutation across the genome. Variation is mainly in the form of single-base substitutions, with insertions and deletions being less common. These mutations occur mostly at "hotspots" in the DNA, which are concentrated in hypervariable regions. These regions correspond to the complementarity-determining regions; the sites involved in antigen recognition on the immunoglobulin. The "hotspots" of somatic hypermutation vary depending on the base that is being mutated. RGYW (i.e. A/G G C/T A/T) for a G, WRCY for a C, WA for an A and TW for a T. The overall result of the hypermutation process is achieved by a balance between error-prone and high fidelity repair. This directed hypermutation allows for the selection of B cells that express immunoglobulin receptors possessing an enhanced ability to recognize and bind a specific foreign antigen.

== Mechanisms ==
Cytosine

Uracil

The mechanism of SHM involves deamination of cytosine to uracil in DNA by the enzyme activation-induced cytidine deaminase, or AID. A cytosine:guanine pair is thus directly mutated to a uracil:guanine mismatch. Uracil residues are not normally found in DNA, therefore, to maintain the integrity of the genome, most of these mutations must be repaired by high-fidelity base excision repair enzymes. The uracil bases are removed by the repair enzyme, uracil-DNA glycosylase, followed by cleavage of the DNA backbone by apurinic endonuclease. Error-prone DNA polymerases are then recruited to fill in the gap and create mutations.

The synthesis of this new DNA involves error-prone DNA polymerases, which often introduce mutations at the position of the deaminated cytosine itself or neighboring base pairs. The introduction of mutations in the rapidly proliferating population of B cells ultimately culminates in the production of thousands of B cells, possessing slightly different receptors and varying specificity for the antigen, from which the B cell with highest affinities for the antigen can be selected. The B cells with the greatest affinity will then be selected to differentiate into plasma cells producing antibody and long-lived memory B cells contributing to enhanced immune responses upon reinfection.

The hypermutation process also utilizes cells that auto-select against the 'signature' of an organism's own cells. It is hypothesized that failures of this auto-selection process may also lead to the development of an auto-immune response.

=== Somatic gene conversion ===
Alternation of DNA by the AID enzyme can also lead to double-strand breaks, which is repaired by gene conversion between similar segments. This process is important for generating antibody diversity in birds because they have a very limited number of genes available for V(D)J recombination. The bird genomes have a large number of pseudogenic V segments which are effectively used by this additional recombination process.

Mammals such as cattle, sheep, and horses have a sufficiently large selection for V(D)J, but they also perform somatic gene conversion. Humans are not known to perform such gene conversion, except for one report of indirect evidence.

== See also ==
- Affinity maturation
- Anergy
- Immune system
- V(D)J recombination
- Immunoglobulin class switching
