= Mucosal immunology =

Field of study

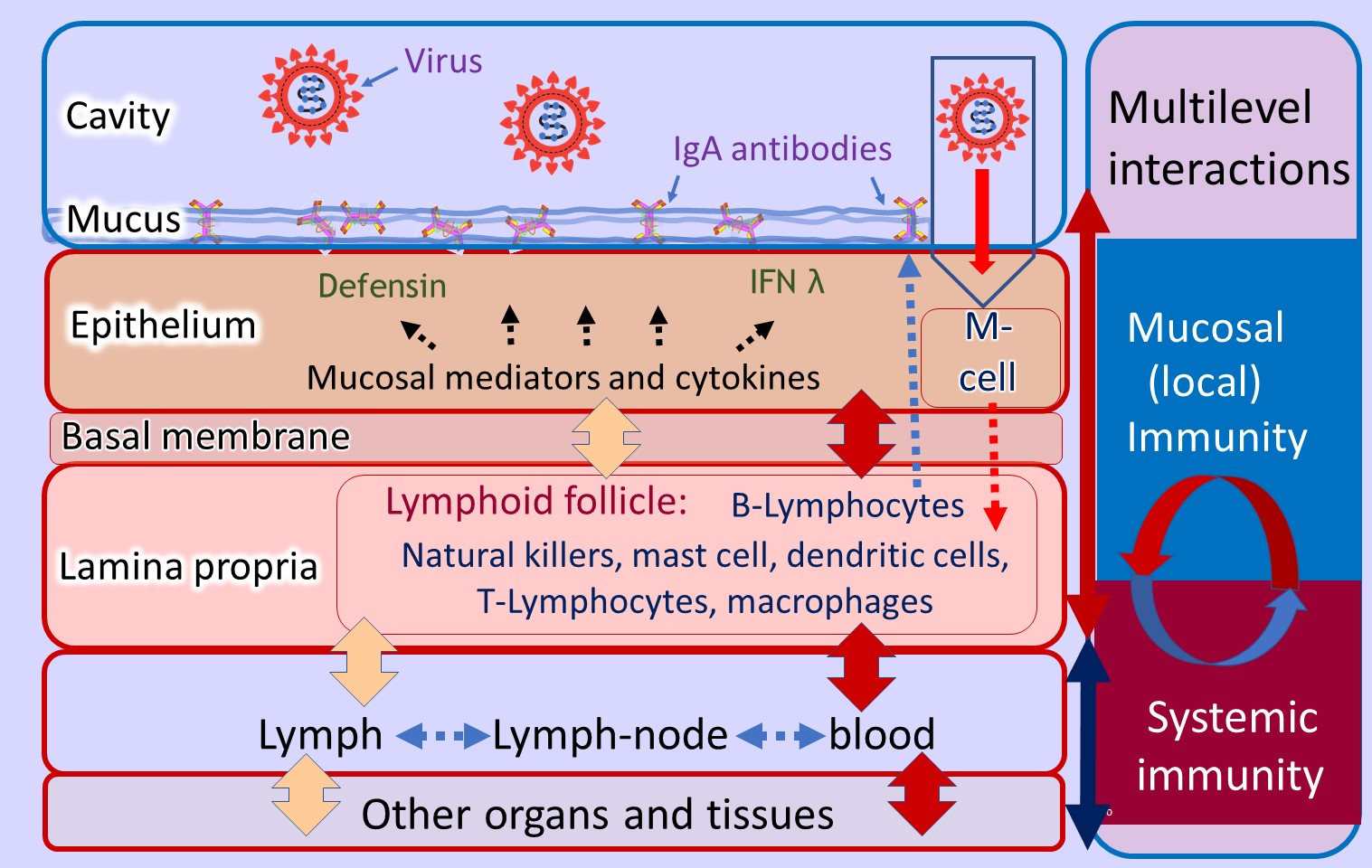
Components of mucosal immune system

Mucosal immunology is the study of immune system responses that occur at mucosal membranes of the intestines, the urogenital tract, and the respiratory system. The mucous membranes are in constant contact with microorganisms, food, and inhaled antigens. In healthy states, the mucus immune system protects the organism against infectious pathogens and maintains a tolerance towards non-harmful commensal microbes and noncancerous substances. Disruption of this balance between tolerance and deprivation of pathogens can lead to pathological conditions such as food allergies, irritable bowel syndrome, susceptibility to infections, and more.

The mucosal immune system consists of a cellular component, humoral immunity, and defense mechanisms that prevent the invasion of microorganisms and harmful foreign substances into the body. These defense mechanisms can be divided into physical barriers (epithelial lining, mucus, cilia function, intestinal peristalsis, etc.) and chemical factors (pH, antimicrobial peptides, etc.).

== Function ==
The mucosal immune system provides three main functions:

- First line of defense from harmful antigenic structures and infection.
- Prevents systemic immune responses to commensal bacteria and food antigens.
- Regulates appropriate immune responses to pathogens.

== Physical barrier ==
Mucosal barrier integrity physically stops pathogens from entering the body. Barrier function is determined by factors such as age, genetics, types of mucins present on the mucosa, interactions between immune cells, nerves and neuropeptides, and co-infection. Barrier integrity depends on the immunosuppressive mechanisms implemented on the mucosa. The mucosal barrier is formed due to the tight junctions between the epithelial cells of the mucosa and the presence of the mucus on the cell surface. The mucins that form mucus offer protection from components on the mucosa by static shielding and limit the immunogenicity of intestinal antigens by inducing an anti-inflammatory state in dendritic cells (DC).

== Active immunity ==
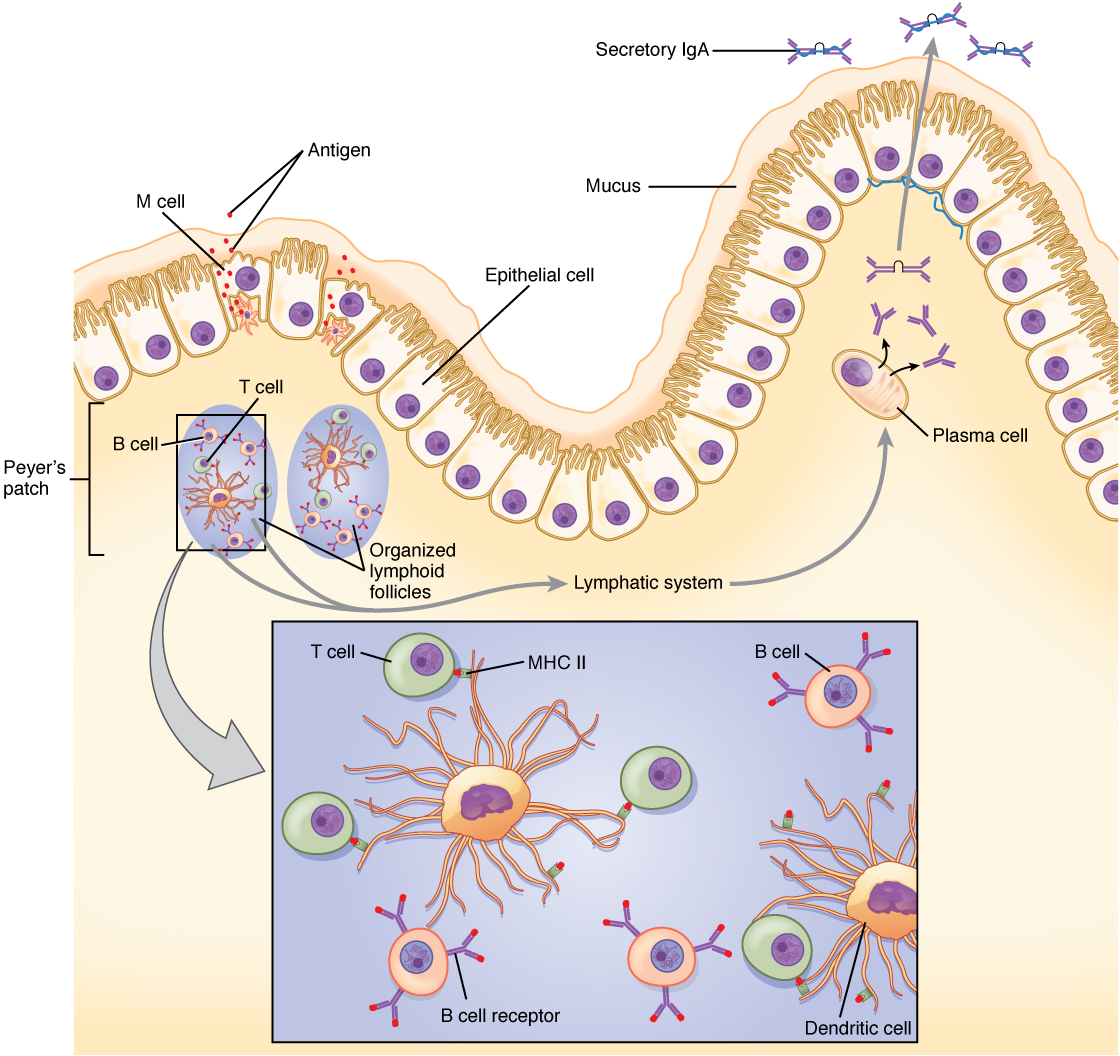
The nasal-associated lymphoid tissue and Peyer's patches of the small intestine generate IgA immunity. Both use M cells to transport antigen inside the body so that immune responses can be mounted.

Because the mucosa surfaces are in constant contact with external antigens and microbiota many immune cells are required. For example, approximately 3/4 of all lymphocytes are found in the mucous membranes. These immune cells reside in secondary lymphoid tissue, largely distributed through the mucosal surfaces.

The mucosa-associated lymphoid tissue (MALT), provides the organism with an important first line of defense. The tonsils and MALT are considered to be secondary lymphoid tissue along with the spleen and lymph nodes.

The MALT's cellular component is composed mostly of dendritic cells, macrophages, innate lymphoid cells, mucosal-associated invariant T cells, intraepithelial T cells, regulatory T cells (Treg), and IgA secreting plasma cells.

Intraepithelial T cells, usually CD8+, reside between mucosal epithelial cells. These cells do not need primary activation like classic T cells. Instead, upon recognition of antigen, these cells initiate their effector functions, resulting in faster removal of pathogens. Tregs are abundant on the mucous membranes and play an important role in maintaining tolerance through various functions, especially through the production of anti-inflammatory cytokines. Mucosal resident antigen-presenting cells (APCs) in healthy people show a tolerogenic phenotype. These APCs do not express TLR2 or TLR4 on their surfaces. In addition, only negligible levels of the LPS receptor CD14 are normally present on these cells. Mucosal dendritic cells determine the type of subsequent immune responses by the production of certain types of cytokines and the type of molecules involved in the co-stimulation. For example production of IL-6 and IL-23 induce Th17 response, IL-12, IL-18 and INF-γ induce Th1 response, IL-4 induces Th2 response, and IL-10, TGF-β and retinoic acid induce tolerance. Innate lymphoid cells are abundant in the mucosa where via rapid cytokine production in response to tissue-derived signals, they act as regulators of immunity, inflammation, and barrier homeostasis.

The adaptive mucosal immune system is involved in maintaining mucosal homeostasis through a mechanism of immune exclusion mediated by secretory antibodies (mostly IgA) that inhibit the penetration of invasive pathogens into the body's tissues and prevent the penetration of potentially dangerous exogenous proteins. Another mechanism of adaptive mucosal immunity is the implementation of immunosuppressive mechanisms mediated mainly by Tregs to prevent local and peripheral hypersensitivity to harmless antigens, i.e. oral tolerance.

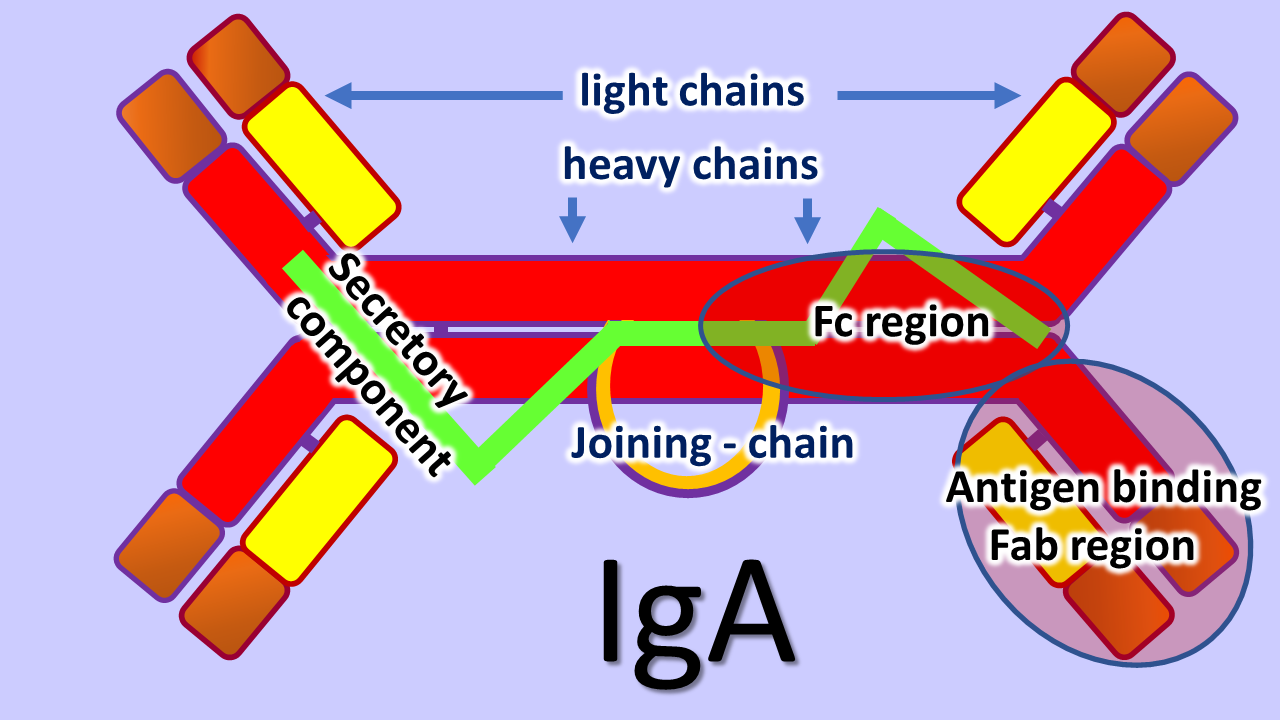
IgA antibody

== Basic immune response in the gut ==
In the gut, lymphoid tissue is dispersed in gut-associated lymphoid tissue (GALT). A large number of immune system cells in the intestines are found in dome-like structures called Peyer's patches and in small mucosal lymphoid aggregates called crypto patches. Above the Peyer's patches is a layer of epithelial cells, which together with the mucus form a barrier against microbial invasion into the underlying tissue. Antigen sampling is a key function of Peyer's patches. Above the Peyer's patches is a much thinner mucus layer that helps the antigen sampling. Specialized phagocytic cells, called M cells, which are found in the epithelial layer of the Peyer's patches, can transport antigenic material across the intestinal barrier through the process of transcytosis. The material transported in this way from the intestinal lumen can then be presented by the antigen-presenting cells present in Peyer's patches. In addition, dendritic cells in Peyer's patches can extend their dendrites through M cell-specific transcellular pores and they can also capture translocated IgA immune complexes. Dendritic cells then present the antigen to naïve T cells in the local mesenteric lymph nodes.

If mucosal barrier homeostasis has not been violated and invasive pathogens are not present, dendritic cells induce tolerance in the gut due to induction of Tregs by secretion of TGF-β and retinoic acid. These Tregs further travel to the lamina propria of villi through lymphatic vessels. There, Tregs produce IL-10 and IL-35, which affects other immune cells in the lamina propria toward a tolerogenic state.

However, damaging the homeostasis of the intestinal barrier leads to inflammation. The epithelium in direct contact with bacteria is activated and begins to produce danger-associated molecular patterns (DAMPs). Alarm molecules released from epithelial cells activate immune cells. Dendritic cells and macrophages are activated in this environment and produce key pro-inflammatory cytokines such as IL-6, IL-12, and IL-23 which activate more immune cells and direct them towards a pro-inflammatory state. The activated effector cells then produce TNF, IFNγ, and IL-17. Neutrophils are attracted to the affected area and begin to perform their effector functions. After the ongoing infection has been removed, the inflammatory response must be stopped to restore homeostasis. The damaged tissue is healed and everything returns to its natural state of tolerance.

== Neonatal ==
At birth, neonates' mucosal immune systems are relatively undeveloped and need intestinal flora colonies to promote development. Microbiota composition stabilizes around the age of 3. In the neonatal period and in early childhood interaction of host immunity with the microbiome is critical. During this interaction various immunity arms are educated. They contribute to homeostasis and determine the future immune system settings, i.e. its susceptibility to infections and inflammatory diseases. For example, the B cell line in the intestinal mucosa is regulated by extracellular signals from commensal microbes that affect the intestinal immunoglobulin repertoire. Diversity of microbiota in early childhood protects the body from the induction of mucosal IgE, which is associated with allergy development.

== Mucosal vaccines ==
Because of its front-line status within the immune system, the mucosal immune system is being investigated for use in vaccines for various afflictions, including COVID-19, HIV, allergies, poliovirus, influenza A and B, rotavirus, vibrio cholerae and many others.

== See also ==
- Microfold cell
