= CALT =

CALT may refer to:

- California Achievement Levels Test
- China Academy of Launch Vehicle Technology
- City Air Logistics & Transportation
- Conjunctival-associated lymphoid tissue, a subtype of MALT
