= City Air Terminal =

City Air Terminal may refer to one of the following terminals:

- Kuala Lumpur City Air Terminal, KL Sentral (Airport city terminal for Kuala Lumpur, Malaysia)
- Makkasan Station, a station on the Airport Rail Link in Bangkok also known as City Air Terminal
- Tokyo City Air Terminal a bus station in Nihonbashi, Tokyo, Japan
- 'Korea City Airport Terminal', a former name of airport bus company City Air Logistics & Transportation based in COEX, South Korea
- Seoul Station City Airport Terminal, an in-town check-in service at Seoul Station, South Korea
