= Bronchus-associated lymphoid tissue =

Tissue

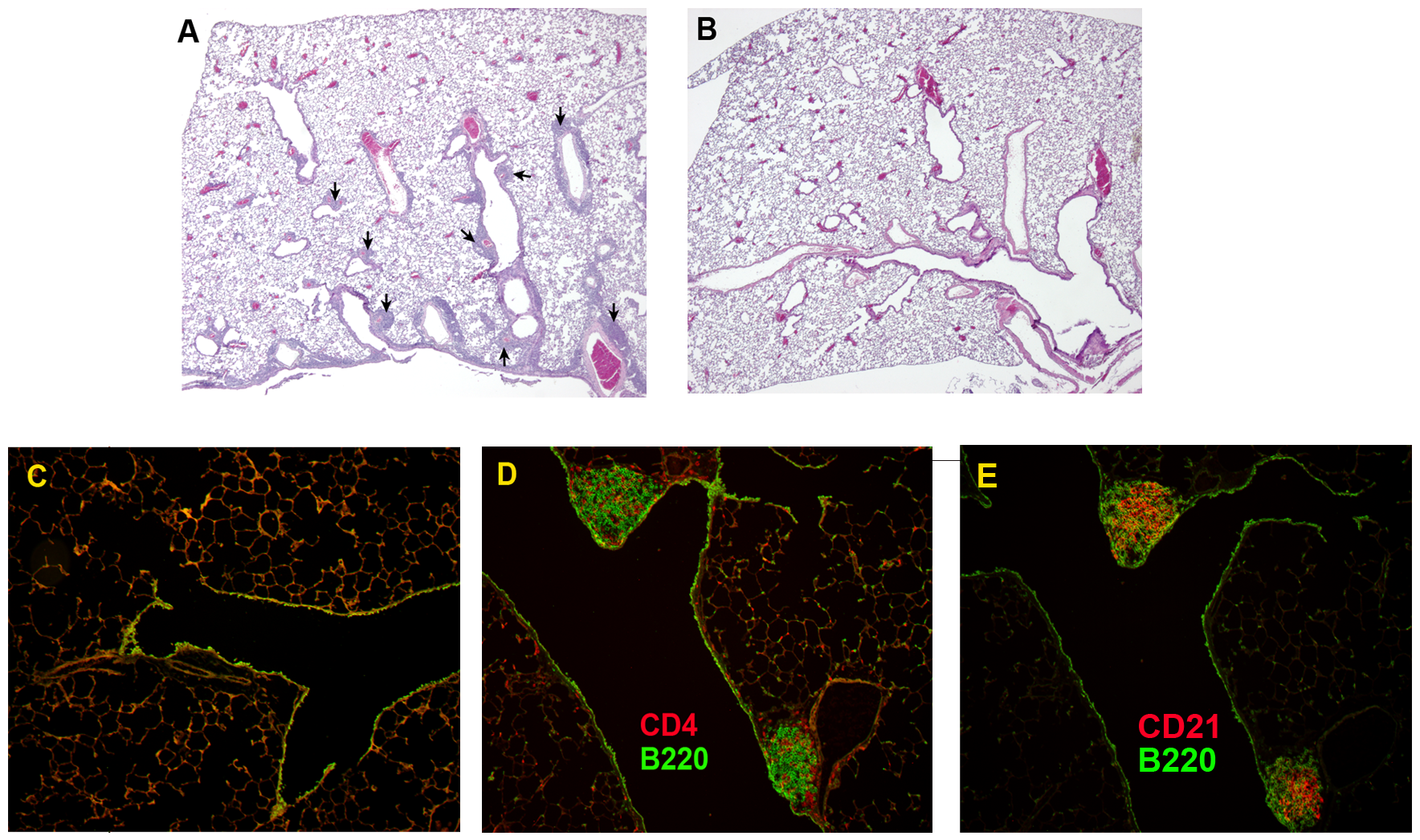
iBALT of mice iBALT structures (arrows) formed in association with airways and blood vessels of the lung after infection (A), no iBALT structures without infection (B and C). Infection-induced iBALT structures contained CD4+ T cells, B220+ B cells (D), and CD21+ follicular dendritic cells (E).

Bronchus-associated lymphoid tissue (BALT) is a tertiary lymphoid structure. It is a part of mucosa-associated lymphoid tissue (MALT), and it consists of lymphoid follicles in the lungs and bronchus. BALT is an effective priming site of the mucosal and systemic immune responses.

== Structure ==
BALT is similar in most mammal species, but it differs in its maintenance and inducibility. While it is normal component of lungs and bronchus in rabbits or pigs, in mice or humans it appears only after infection or inflammation. In mice and humans it is thus called inducible BALT (iBALT). BALT and iBALT are structurally and functionally very similar, so in this article only BALT is used for both structures.

BALT is found along the bifurcations of the upper bronchi directly beneath the epithelium and generally lying between an artery and a bronchus. It is also in perivascular, peribronchial and even interstitial areas in the lower airways of the lung. To call it BALT it has to be structured accumulation of lymphocytes and other immune cells. There are lymphoid follicles with apparent germinal centres with most B-cells surrounded by T-cell area. In interfollicular T-cell area, there are many dendritic cells presenting antigen to T-cells and in germinal centres, there are follicular dendritic cells. There are CD4^{+} Th lymphocytes in germinal centres and interfollicular area and CD8^{+} T cells mainly in interfollicular area. High endothelial venules (HEVs) are also present in BALT in T/B-cell interface, allowing for the recruitment of naive T cells. These HEV are the only entry site for lymphocytes to migrate into the BALT and leave by efferent lymphatic vessels. In some species, M cells have been described in epithelium above BALT similar to M cells in the dome epithelium of Peyer's patches, although the dome epithelium is not typical for BALT.

For formation of BALT in mice is necessary inteleukin-17 and VCAM-1, PNAd and LFA-1 and it is lymphotoxin-α independent whereas the development of secondary lymphoid organs (such as lymph nodes and Peyer's patches) is typically dependent on LTα. Formation of BALT may be caused by disabled in situ function of Treg cells.

== Function ==
Function and purpose of BALT is not completely known yet. It is also unclear if its formation is part of normal immune response or if it is pathologic and should be suppressed.

BALT is included in the efficient priming of adaptive B-cell and T-cell responses directed against airborne antigens. It needs dendritic cells to its maintenance and function. Inducible BALT is formed after infection, e.g. influenza, and peak in size between 1 and 2 weeks after infection and diminish thereafter. Immune responses initiated in iBALT are delayed relative to the immune response in the draining lymph nodes, owing to the time it takes to form iBALT. However, in chronic disease iBALT may be a component of the pathology. BALT can be induced even in fetal lungs after chorioamnionitis or intrauterine pneumonia. Also there is an evidence that cigarette smoke can induce formation of BALT in humans and rats. BALT can also occur after other stimuli, e.g. inflammation caused by rheumatoid arthritis or other autoimmune lung disease or mechanic damage by dust particles.
