= NALT =

NALT may refer to:

- National Agricultural Library Thesaurus (NALT). NALT is used by organizations as a key component for organizing and describing agricultural information.
- Northwest Achievement Levels Test
- Nasal-associated lymphoid tissue
- N-Acetyl-L-tyrosine, an amino acid and dietary supplement
- N-Allyltryptamine, a psychedelic drug
