= Nasal-associated lymphoid tissue =

Tissue

Nasal- or nasopharynx- associated lymphoid tissue (NALT) represents immune system of nasal mucosa and is a part of mucosa-associated lymphoid tissue (MALT) in mammals. It protects body from airborne viruses and other infectious agents. In humans, NALT is considered analogous to Waldeyer's ring.

== Structure ==
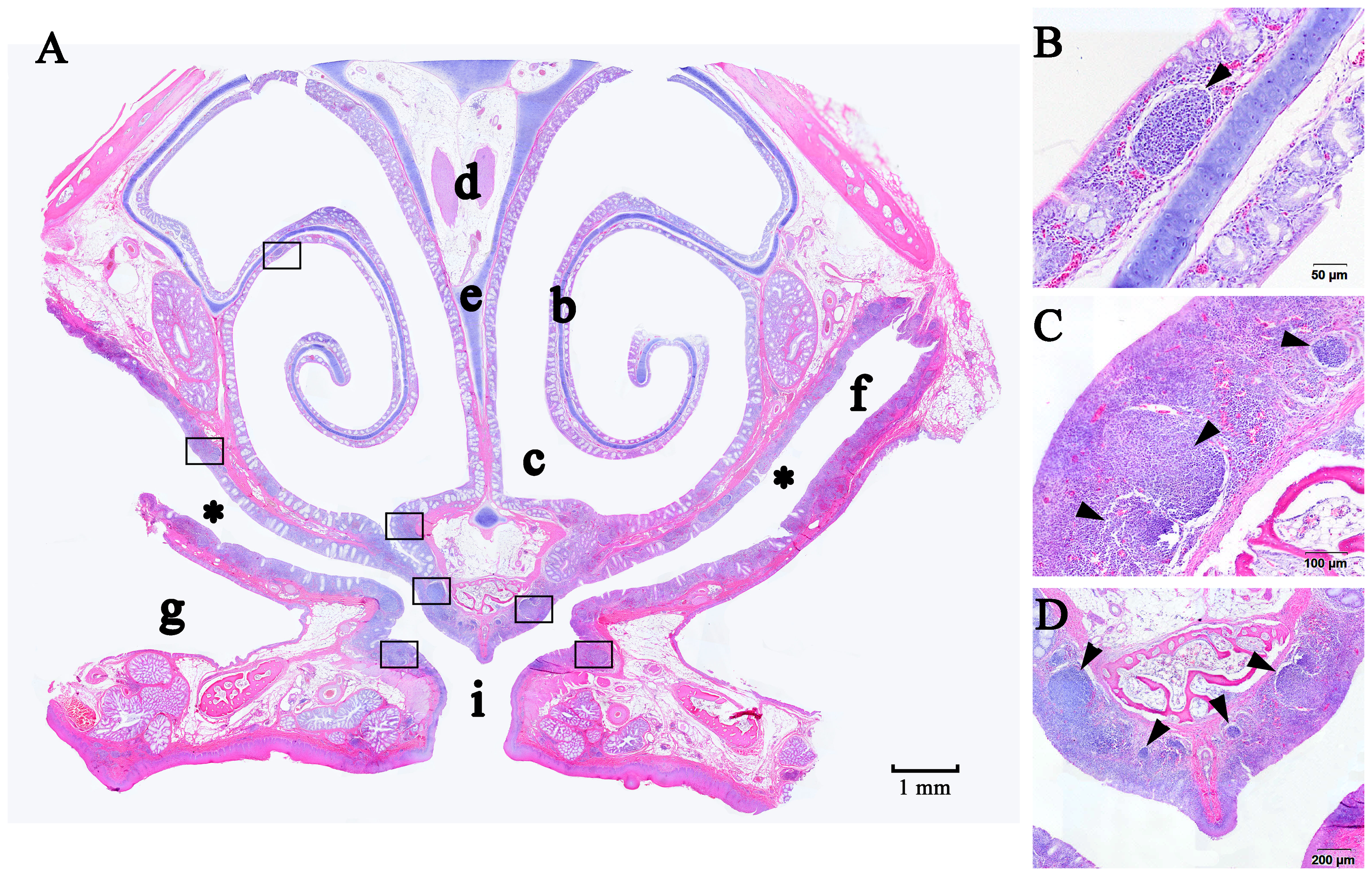
Cross-section from the chicken's nasal cavity. (A) Panoramic scanning of the section, (b) concha nasalis media, (c) meatus nasi, (d) optic nerve of nervi trigeminus, (e) nasal septum, (f) inferior nasal meatus, (g) infraorbital sinus, (i) choanal cleft. (B) Diffuse lymphoid follicle covered by FAE located on the concha nasalis media. (C) NALT located on the dorsal side of choanal cleft. (D) NALT located on the nasal septum.

NALT in mice is localized on cartilaginous soft palate of upper jaw, it is situated bilaterally on the posterior side of the palate. It consists mainly of lymphocytes, T cell and B cell enriched zones, follicle-associated epithelium (FAE) with epithelial M cells and some erythrocytes. M cells are typical for antigen intake from mucosa. In some areas of NALT, there are lymphatic vessels and HEVs (high endothelial venule). Dendritic cells and macrophages are also present.

NALT contains about same amount of T cells and B cells. The T-cell population contains about 3–4 times more CD4^{+} T cells than CD8^{+} T cells. Most of T cells are with αβ T cell receptor (TCR) and only few are with γδ TCR. CD4^{+} T cells are in naive state, marked by high expression of CD45RB. B cells are mostly in unswitched state, with sIgM^{+} IgD^{+} phenotype.

== Development ==
Formation of NALT starts early after birth, it is not present during embrygenesis or in newborn mice. First signs of NALT (HEV with associated lymphocytes) occurs one week after birth, but full formation is established after 5–8 weeks. In contrast to Peyer's patches and lymph nodes, NALT formation is independent of IL-7R, LT-βR and ROR-γ signalling. It requires Id2 gene, which induce genesis of CD3^{−}CD4^{+}CD45^{+} cells. These cells accumulates on the site of NALT after birth and induce NALT formation.

== Function ==
NALT in mice has strategic position for incoming pathogens and it is the first site of recognition and elimination of inhaled pathogens. It has a key role in inducing mucosal and systemic immune response. NALT is inductive site of MALT similarly to Peyer's patches in a small intestine.

After intranasal immunization or pathogen recognition, lymphocytes in NALT proliferate and differentiate. They start to produce cytokines, such as IFN-γ, type I interferons, IL-2, IL-4, IL-5, IL-6 or IL-10 (amount depend on used immunizating agent or adjuvans). B cells go through isotype switching and produce antigen-specific IgM, IgG and mainly IgA. Activated B cells can migrate through body to respiratory and genito-uritary tract, because they express chemokine receptors CCR10 and α_{4}β_{1}-integrin. Memory T and B cells are established and last for long time after immunization.

== Vaccination ==
Intranasal (i.n.) immunization or vaccination is an effective way to stimulate respiratory immune system. This way of immunization can provoke both the cell-mediated and humoral immune responses and is capable of stimulating both the mucosal and systemic immune systems. A dose of i.n. administered antigen can be much smaller than of oral administered antigen, because antigens are not exposed to digestive enzymes. Thus, it would be a suitable way of vaccination against airborne viruses and bacteria. In 1997, nasal-spray vaccine containing inactivated influenza virus with nLT (heat-labile enterotoxin) as adjuvants was used in Switzerland, but it had to be withdrawn from the market, because it caused Bell's palsy in some patients. Thus, scientists are looking for more suitable and safe adjuvants, for expamle, Masafumi Yamamoto et al. in 1998 on mice model proved safe and efficient i.n. vaccination against Streptococcus pneumoniae and in 2002 also against influenza virus.
