= Johann Conrad Peyer =

Swiss anatomist

Johann Conrad Peyer (26 December 1653 – 29 February 1712) was a Swiss anatomist who was a native of Schaffhausen.

== Biography ==
He studied medicine in Paris under Guichard Joseph Duverney (1648–1730), in Montpellier under Raymond Vieussens (1635–1713) and received his medical degree in 1681 at Basel. Later, he returned to Schaffhausen in order to practice medicine. Here, he performed research with Johann Jakob Wepfer (1620–1695), and Wepfer's son-in-law Johann Conrad Brunner (1653–1727).

in 1677 Peyer published Exercitatio anatomico-medica de glandulis intestinorum earumque usu et affectionibus, in which he describes the eponymous Peyer's patches. These anatomical structures are aggregated lymphatic nodules found in the lining of the small intestine. He was also the author of an influential work on veterinary medicine titled Merycologia sive de Ruminantibus et Ruminatione Commentariae.
