= Mucosa-associated lymphoid tissue =

Diffuse system of lymphoid tissue

Details
- System: Lymphatic system

Identifiers
- Acronym(s): MALT 2
- FMA: 62819

The mucosa-associated lymphoid tissue (MALT), also called mucosa-associated lymphatic tissue, is a diffuse system of small concentrations of lymphoid tissue found in various submucosal membrane sites of the body, such as the gastrointestinal tract, nasopharynx, thyroid, breast, lung, salivary glands, eye, and skin. MALT is populated by lymphocytes such as T cells and B cells, as well as plasma cells, dendritic cells and macrophages, each of which is well situated to encounter antigens passing through the mucosal epithelium. The appendix, long misunderstood as a vestigial organ, is now recognized as a key MALT structure, playing an essential role in B-lymphocyte-mediated immune responses, hosting extrathymically derived T-lymphocytes, regulating pathogens through its lymphatic vessels, and potentially producing early defenses against diseases. In the case of intestinal MALT, M cells are also present, which sample antigen from the lumen and deliver it to the lymphoid tissue. MALT constitute about 50% of the lymphoid tissue in human body. Immune responses that occur at mucous membranes are studied by mucosal immunology.

== Categorization ==
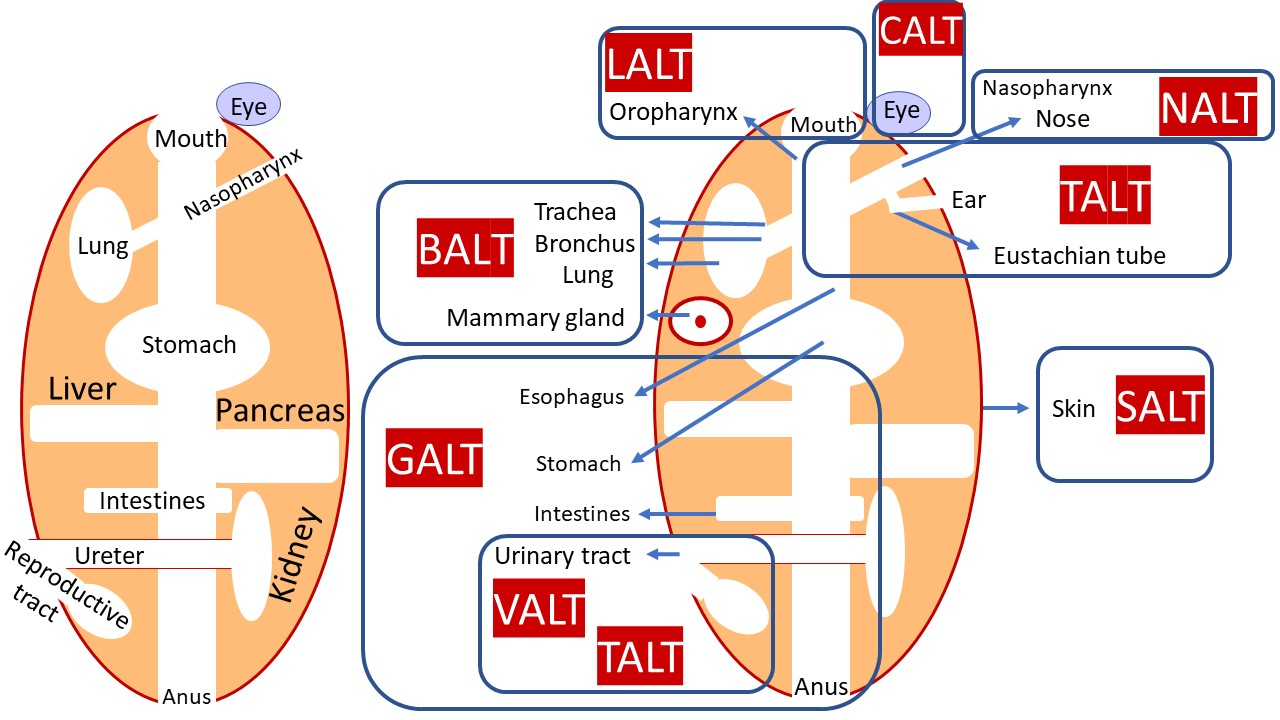
The components of MALT

The components of MALT are sometimes subdivided into the following:

- GALT (gut-associated lymphoid tissue. Peyer's patches are a component of GALT found in the lining of the small intestines.)
- BALT (bronchus-associated lymphoid tissue)
- NALT (nasal-associated lymphoid tissue)
- CALT (conjunctival-associated lymphoid tissue)
- LALT (larynx-associated lymphoid tissue)
- SALT (skin-associated lymphoid tissue)
- VALT (vulvo-vaginal-associated lymphoid tissue)
- TALT (testis-associated lymphoid tissue)

It can be also distinguished by level of organization of the tissue:

- O-MALT (organized mucosa-associated lymphatic tissue); the tonsils of Waldeyer's tonsillar ring, and Peyer's patches are O-MALT.
- D-MALT (diffuse mucosa-associated lymphatic tissue); MALT that is not organized as a separately macroscopically anatomically identifiable mass, tissue or organ (such as the aforementioned O-MALT) is diffuse MALT.

== Role in disease ==
MALT plays a role in regulating mucosal immunity. It may be the site of lymphomas, usually a non-Hodgkin lymphoma. A specific entity is the marginal zone B-cell lymphoma (a subtype of which is termed MALT lymphoma). Certain subtypes of marginal zone B cell lymphomas such as those occurring in the stomach are commonly caused by Helicobacter pylori infection. Peyer's Patches, groupings of lymphoid follicles in the mucous membrane, monitor the GALT closely to regulate pathogens that traverse through the area. Due to the function of M cells in Peyer's patches, involving the adherence and transport of antigens across a single layer of epithelial cells, dysfunction in these structures could allow an entry point to pathogens.
