= Computerized Achievement Levels Test =

Student achievement test

The Computerized Achievement Levels Test is a student achievement test, and is more commonly referred to as the Northwest Achievement Levels Test (NALT), the paper version of the test.

According to McGraw-Hill, the publisher of the CAT, CAT/5 tests accurately measure achievement in reading, language, spelling, mathematics, study skills, science, and social studies. CAT/5 reports are available in many formats for different target audiences. By presenting relevant, accurate results in a variety of ways, reports can assist teachers with instructional planning, indicate curricula directions for administrators, and help parents understand areas where children are academically strong and where added attention may be necessary.

Additionally, the publisher says test content represents different cultures and covers a broad range of subjects, appealing to all students.

According to Frontline (PBS), although many believe that tests are the best or only indicator of student performance, it is important to remember that there are other indicators of a child's knowledge and skill levels. Moreover, achievement tests are sometimes used to measure or evaluate aspects of education for which they are not designed, including how well a school is educating its students. Despite what some see as problems and controversies, tests are very successful in measuring the things they are designed to measure. There are, however, many skills and attributes tests do not measure. For example, standardized tests do not measure a child's motivation to understand new material and perform well in school. They also will not measure a child's creativity or curiosity, nor the ability to cooperate in a group, challenge assumptions, or complete in-depth projects. None of these characteristics is tested, yet they are all essential skills for further education, workplace preparation, and life in general. It is important to remember that performance on standardized tests is not a complete indication of the full range of a child's academic abilities.
