= Gut-associated lymphoid tissue =

Tissue

Details
- System: Lymphatic system

Identifiers
- Acronym: GALT
- FMA: 62820

Gut-associated lymphoid tissue (GALT) is a component of the mucosa-associated lymphoid tissue (MALT) which works in the immune system to protect the body from invasion in the gut.

Owing to its physiological function in food absorption, the mucosal surface is thin and acts as a permeable barrier to the interior of the body. Equally, its fragility and permeability creates vulnerability to infection and, in fact, the vast majority of the infectious agents invading the human body use this route. The functional importance of GALT in body's defense relies on its large population of plasma cells, which are antibody producers, whose number exceeds the number of plasma cells in spleen, lymph nodes and bone marrow combined. GALT makes up about 70% of the immune system by weight; compromised GALT may significantly affect the strength of the immune system as a whole.

== Structure ==
The gut-associated lymphoid tissue lies throughout the intestine, covering an area of approximately 260–300 m^{2}. In order to increase the surface area for absorption, the intestinal mucosa is made up of finger-like projections (villi), covered by a monolayer of epithelial cells, which separates the GALT from the lumen intestine and its contents. These epithelial cells are covered by a layer of glycocalyx on their luminal surface so as to protect cells from the acid pH.

New epithelial cells derived from stem cells are constantly produced on the bottom of the intestinal glands, regenerating the epithelium (epithelial cell turnover time is less than one week). Although in these crypts conventional enterocytes are the dominant type of cells, Paneth cells can also be found. These are located at the bottom of the crypts and release a number of antibacterial substances, among them lysozyme, and are thought to be involved in the control of infections.

Underneath them, there is an underlying layer of loose connective tissue called lamina propria. There is also lymphatic circulation through the tissue connected to the mesenteric lymph nodes.

Both GALT and mesenteric lymph nodes are sites where the immune response is started due to the presence of immune cells through the epithelial cells and the lamina propria.

The GALT also includes the Peyer's patches of the small intestine, isolated lymphoid follicles present throughout the intestine, and the appendix in humans.

The following examples comprise lymphoid tissues that act as interfaces between immune system and incoming antigens either as food antigens or as pathogenic or commensal microbiota's antigens:

- Waldeyer's tonsillar ring
- Small lymphoid aggregates in the esophagus
- Lymphoid tissue accumulating with age in the stomach
- Peyer's patches in the small intestine
- Diffusely distributed lymphoid cells and plasma cells in the lamina propria of the gut
- Intraepithelial lymphocytes (IELs) interspersed into epithelial layer of mucosal surfaces
- Lymphoid aggregates in the appendix and large intestine
- Mesenteric lymph nodes draining lymph coming from the gut tissue

GALT can be also divided into two categories considering the structure, from which the function arise. There can be found 1.) organised GALT made up from folicules – such as Peyer's patches, mesenteric lymph nodes and even more organised appendix. Its main function is to induce immune reaction. 2.) diffuse GALT with single T and B cells, macrophages, eosinophiles, basophiles and mast cells, preferentially found in lamina propria. This part of GALT is made up from mature effector cells ready to perform their actions.

The GALT has been described in the adult eastern grey kangaroo (Macropus giganteus), tammar wallaby (Notamacropus eugenii), stripe-faced dunnart (Sminthopsis macroura), and red-tailed phascogale (Phascogale calura). The adult northern brown bandicoot (Isoodon macrourus) has been described to have both organised and diffuse GALT.

The development of the GALT has also been described in several marsupial species, including tammar wallabies, stripe-faced dunnarts (Sminthopsis macroura), and red-tailed phascogales

=== Peyer's patches ===
The Peyer's patch is an aggregate of lymphoid cells projected to the lumen of the gut which acts as a very important site for the initiation of the immune response. It forms a subepithelial dome where large number of B cell follicles with its germinal centers, T cell areas between them in a smaller number and dendritic cells are found. In this area, the subepithelial dome is separated from the intestinal lumen by a layer of follicle-associated epithelium. This contains conventional intestinal epithelial cells and a small number of specialized epithelial cells called microfold cells (M cells) in between. Unlike enterocytes, these M cells present a folded luminal surface instead of the microvilli, do not secrete digestive enzymes or mucus and lack a thick surface of glycocalix, so it can be in contact with microbiota and antigens presented in the content of gut.

== Function ==
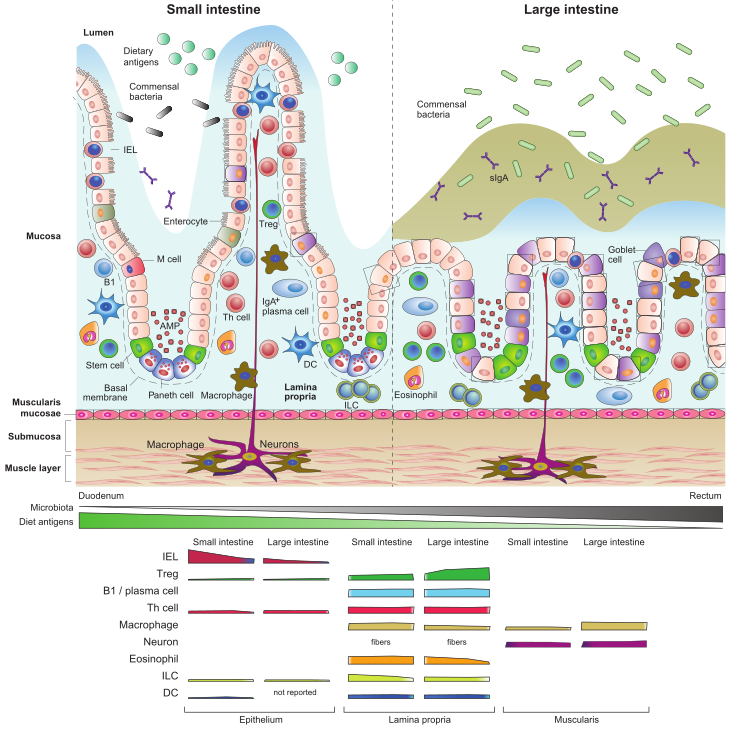
Intestinal microenvironments and niches.

Under normal circumstances, immune system of the whole organism needs intestinal source of antigens to train and regulate development of various immune cells. Without having such stimulation, many properties of immune systems do not develop, as it is shown on the case of germ-free animals. Because immune cells are in constant touch with bacterial and food antigens, the primary response is set up as tolerogenic. The complex interaction between these intestinal microbiota, the intestinal epithelial layer, and the local mucosal immune system is essential for maintaining gut health and systemic immunity because the nutrition level of a person's diet contributes to the gut microbiota (a multispecies microbial community of bacteria, fungi, and viruses, all in a particular niche) that is in synergy with the host. Still there must be a robust defence in a case that pathogens cross either the border line of epithelium or produce harmful substances like bacterial toxins. Such a compromise is ensured by diverse types of immune cells:

=== B-lymphocytes ===
Plasma B cells residing at lamina propria produce high levels of specific secretory IgA (sIgA) antibodies. These IgA are secreted into the lumen of the gut through the epithelial layer by transcytosis. Firstly epithelial cell binds a dimer of IgA via polymeric Ig receptor at the basolateral side and transports it in a vesicle into the luminal space. Then the receptor is proteolytically cleaved and the dimer of IgA is released with a portion of the receptor called the secretory component. The secretory component protects secreted antibodies against the digestive milieu in the gut.

A high level of secretory IgA results from the interaction of B cells and intestinal antigen presenting dendritic cell (DC) in cooperation with follicular T helper cell (Tfh) in the germinal centers (GCs) of Peyer's patches. There are two main ways of IgA production 1) T-cell dependent resulting in sIgAs with high affinity and specificity and 2) T-cell independent generation of sIgA, which utilizes dendritic cells and their production of BAFF and APRIL cytokines. T-cell independently produced sIgAs have lower affinity and coat mainly commensals. General functions of secretory IgAs are to coat any of the intestinal bacteria (commensal or pathogenic ones) to impair their motility and to prevent them from getting in prolonged and direct contact with the intestinal epithelium and the host intestinal immune system. This is called immune exclusion. Secreted IgAs bind to bacterial toxins and neutralize them as well.

=== T-lymphocytes ===
Naïve CD4+T cells differentiate into Treg or various helper T cell subsets (Th1, Th2, Th17 or Tfh). In the gut-associated lymphoid tissue, the process of differentiation occurs via presentation of antigens derived from gut microbiota by antigen presenting cells such as dendritic cells or M cells in Peyer's patches. Typical process of an oral tolerance towards ingested food antigens can be described as continuous luminal sampling of antigens by DCs and their subsequent migration followed by priming of naïve T cells in mesenteric lymph nodes to become immunosuppressive T cells (Treg). Antigens received in this way ensure tolerance against them. Commensal microbiota activates immune response as well - in a way that protects host intestinal tissue from damaging it by immune cell reactions. The outcome of T cell populations in healthy individuals differs from the spectrum of T cells resulting from acute infection or chronic inflammation. Inappropriate stimulation (typically by segmented filamentous bacteria - SFB) of chronic Th1 or Th17 cell response plays a crucial role in pathological damage to the host.

Several novel gut-associated lymphoid cells have been described. They are of different origins and follow different maturation processes but share the same GALT role – to rapidly respond to pathogens and secrete effector cytokines. Such multi-layered protection systems highlights the susceptibility of mucosal sites to invading agents. The mucosal route is the most frequent way for entering of pathogenic infections into the host. Robust engagement of a variety of lymphoid cells patrolling the epithelial layer also reflects evolutionary pressure and arms race between immune systems and pathogens escaping its control.

==== Intraepithelial lymphocytes (IELs) ====
Long-lived and residential intraepithelial lymphocytes (IELs) are one of the largest populations of T-lymphocytes in the body. In contrast to other peripheral lymphocytes, IEL do not circulate in the blood stream or lymphatic system but reside in the epithelial layer in intestine. Such location in very special per itself – IELs patrol the condition within a single layer of cells and have dendritic look. They provide the first line of defense in case of pathogen crossing the epithelial barrier. IELs encompass surprising diversity of origins and divide into two main categories – conventional and nonconventional. It is based on molecular surface properties and the place where they acquire their final effector cytotoxic program.

Conventional IELs bear classical TCR receptor made up from α and β subunit together with CD4 or CD8 co-receptors. They represent a relative minority of the total intestinal IELs compared with unconventional IELs. They are derived from naïve T cells that encounter antigens in the periphery (typically antigens displayed by DC in the Peyer's patches). After this activation, conventional IELs express gut-tropic molecules allowing them to home in intestinal tissue after trafficking through lymph stream and subsequent blood stream. Conventional intraepithelial cells are thus tissue-resident effector memory T cells, capable of rapid respond with cytolytic activity and release of cytokines such as INFγ and TNF.

Unconventional IELs present majority of IEL cells in intestinal epithelial layer and acquire their effector program after exiting thymus as naïve cells and encountering antigens in GALT. After such stimulation, unconventional IELs (mainly γδ T cells) reside in the intestinal epithelium. γδ T cells express TCR receptor made of γ and δ subunit and do not recognize antigen peptides presented in the MHC-bound form. The process of their activation is still largely unknown. Main property of γδ T cells is formation of long-lived memory populations in barrier tissues such as intestinal epithelium or in the skin. They perform immune memory in particular tissue even after clearance of pathogen or retreat of inflammation.

==== Innate lymphoid cells (ILCs) ====
Innate lymphoid cells (ILCs) are the most recently discovered family of innate immune cells and term "innate" means they do not need antigen receptor gene rearrangement. Due to the development of novel method, such as single cell RNA sequencing, subtypes of innate lymphoid cells are described. Based on their transcriptional profile set by main transcription factors ILCs are divided into five distinct subsets: NK cells, ILC1s, ILC2s, ILC3s, and LTi cells. ILCs are prevalent at mucosal surfaces, playing a key role in mucosal immunity and homeostasis due to their ability of rapid secretion of immunoregulatory cytokines and thus communicating with other immune cells.

=== Innate immunity ===
Beside adaptive specific immunity, an innate immunity plays a significant role in GALT because it provides more rapid response. Recognition of microbial non-self signature occurs by pattern recognition receptors (PRR) that can be found on dendritic cells, macrophages, monocytes, neutrophils and epithelial cells. PRRs bind to conserved microbial pattern like cell walls components (LPS, teichoic acid, flagellin, peptidoglycan) or viral or bacterial nucleic acid. PRRs are localized extracellularly as membrane-bound receptors (Toll-like receptors) or intracellularly (NOD-like and RIG-like receptors). Varied palette of pattern recognition receptors is activated by various signals named PAMP (pathogen associated molecular patterns) or by signals connected to tissue damage named DAMP (damage associated molecular patterns).

==== Macrophages ====
Majority of antigen presenting cells (APCs) in intestine is derived from macrophages, which have very quick turnover. Macrophages are prevalent in lamina propria and submucosal deeper layers like muscularis layer. Macrophages can use their trans-epithelial dendrites (long cytoplasmic extensions) and directly contact epithelial layer and sample luminal bacteria. Under healthy conditions macrophages engulf commensal bacteria and surrounding cellular debris, secrete IL-10, drive maturation of Treg and contribute to tissue homeostasis. Because of low expression of innate response receptors and co-stimulatory surface molecules, intestinal macrophages do not initiate inflammation. But upon infection or inflammation, the profile of macrophages changes and they start to secrete large amounts of TNF-α and become proinflammatory effector cells.

==== Dendritic cells ====
DCs present less than 10% of lamina propria APC and typically do not reside in lower layers. Inherent production of retinoic acid and TGF-β (typical for gut-associated DCs) induces expression of gut-homing molecules and favor IgA switch during maturation of B cells in folicules. DCs also direct Treg and conventional IELs to receive their final phenotype of mature effector cells in intestine.

== Other animals ==
Adaptive immunity, mediated by antibodies and T cells, is only found in vertebrates. Whereas all of them have a gut-associated lymphoid tissue and the vast majority have a version of spleen and thymus, not all vertebrates show bone marrow, lymph nodes or germinal centers, meaning that not all vertebrates can generate lymphocytes in bone marrow. This different distribution of the adaptive organs in the different groups of vertebrates suggests GALT as the very earliest part of the adaptive immune system in vertebrates. It has been suggested that from this existing GALT, and due to the pressure by commensal bacteria of the gut that coevolved with vertebrates, later specializations such as thymus, spleen and lymph nodes appeared as part of the adaptive immune system.

== Additional images ==
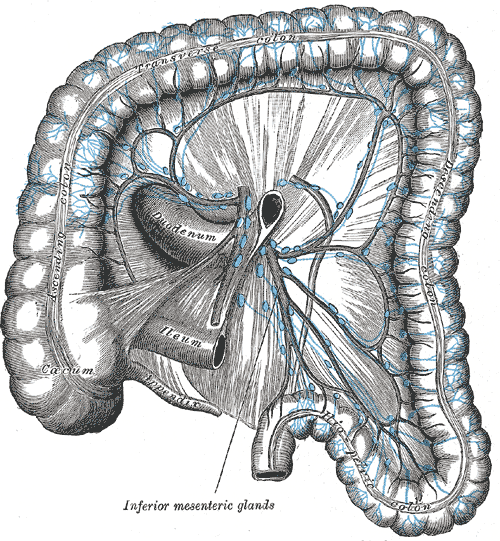
Lymphatics of colon.

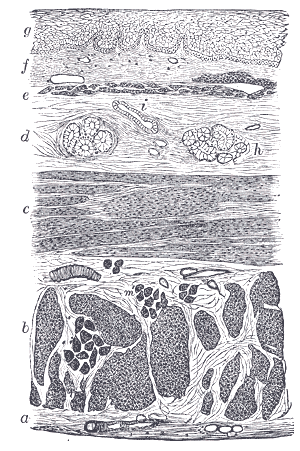
Section of the human esophagus.

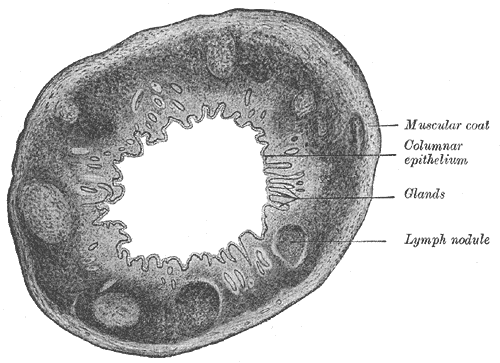
Transverse section of human vermiform process. X 20.

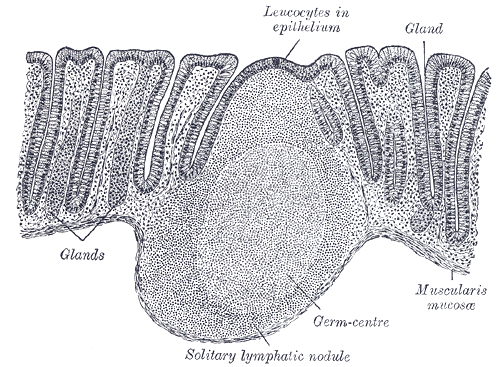
Section of mucous membrane of human rectum. X 60.
