= City Air Logistics & Transportation =

Airport bus company based in Seoul, South Korea

Coordinates: 37.5098°N 127.0596°E

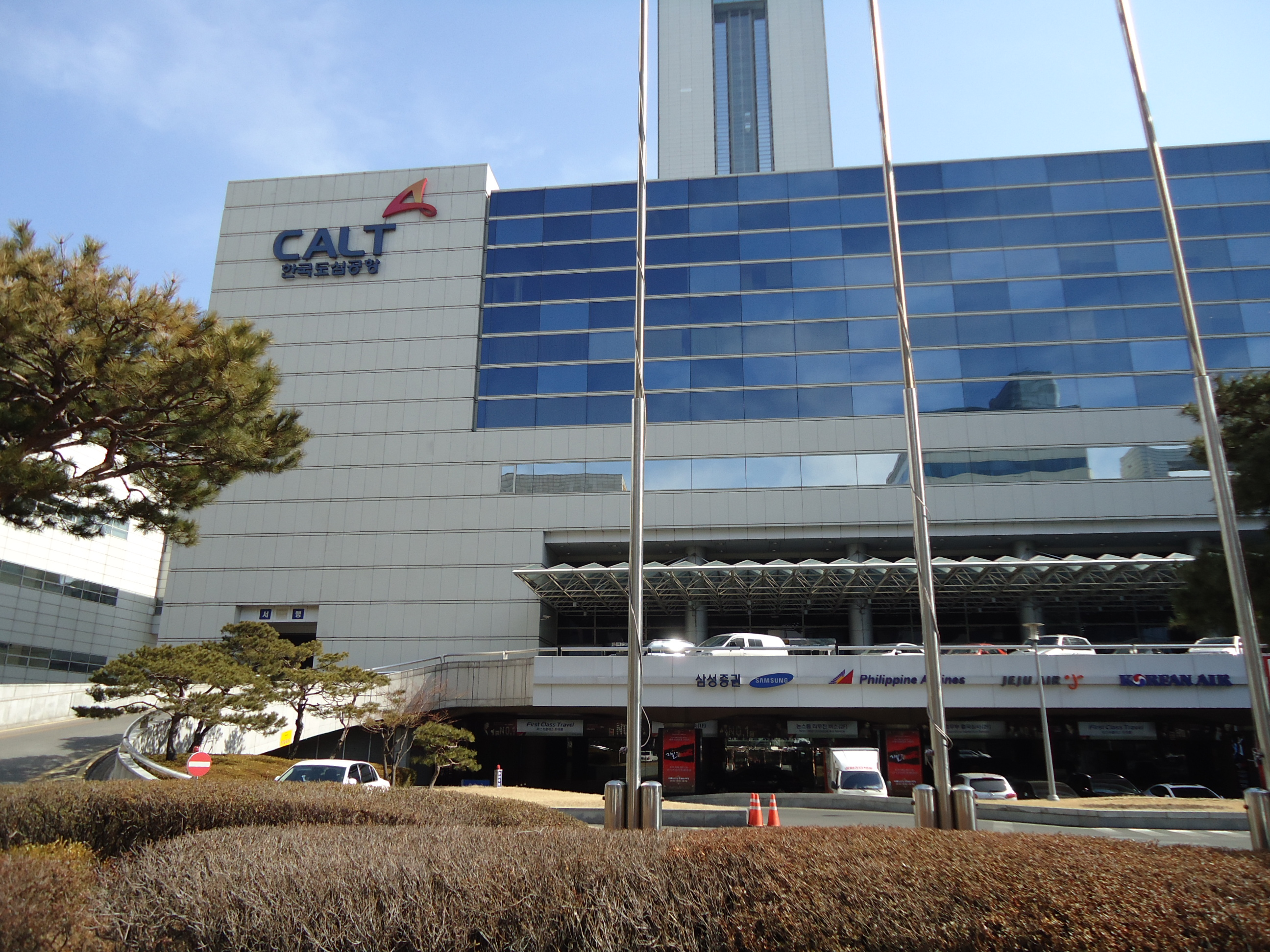
Headquarters building at COEX, Gangnam

The City Air Logistics & Transportation (CALT), formerly known as 'Korea City Airport Terminal Co., Ltd.' (Korean: 한국도심공항 주식회사), is a 1985 established South Korean airport bus company headquartered in COEX, Gangnam District of Seoul.

CALT launched its business in 1990 pursuing synergy between airport bus line and city airport terminal, yet the latter operation got permanently closed in February 2023. Though the CALT was the first company in South Korea running the 'city airport terminal', a Korean-styled English neologism for concept of in-town airline check-in services, it could not survive competition against rising mobile check-in services via smartphone.

In the last two years, even after South Korea went out from COVID-19 epidemic, the company suffered loss of deficit around 4 billion Korean Won every year, so had to permanently close the in-town airline check-in service at COEX in year 2023. The company is now just a company running bus lines around airports in Seoul. From then, the only available in-town check-in service is provided in Seoul Station City Airport Terminal at Seoul Station.

== See also ==
- Seoul Station City Airport Terminal
- Gwangmyeong Station
