= Airport check-in =

Process of being approved to board an airplane

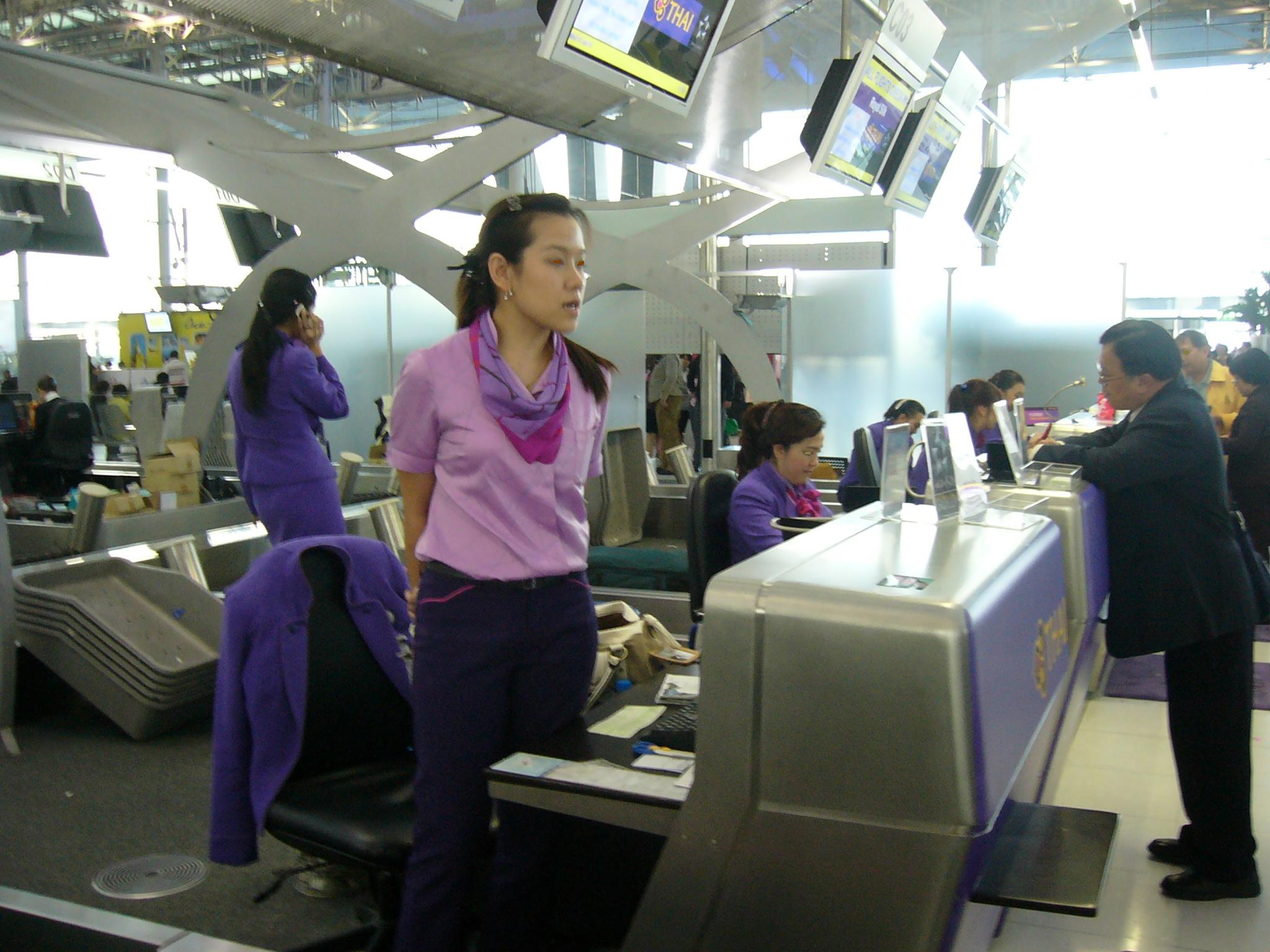
Check-in counters of Thai Airways International at Suvarnabhumi Airport, Bangkok

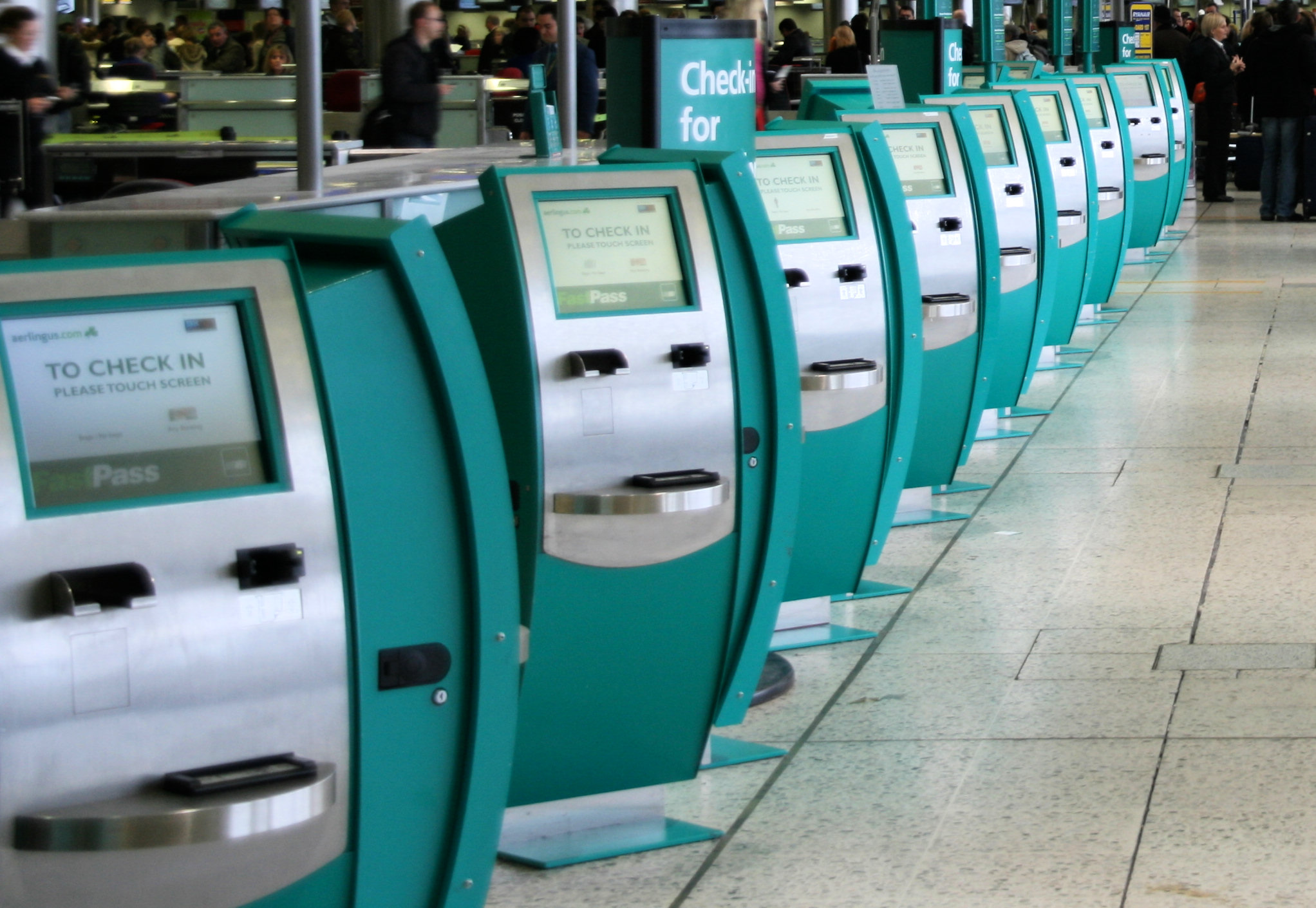
Aer Lingus self-check-in at Dublin Airport

Airport check-in is the process whereby an airline approves airplane passengers to board an airplane for a flight. Airlines typically use service counters found at airports for this process, and the check-in is normally handled by an airline itself or a handling agent working on behalf of an airline. Passengers usually hand over any baggage that they do not wish or are not allowed to carry in the aircraft's cabin and receive a boarding pass before they can proceed to board their aircraft.

Check-in is usually the first procedure for a passenger when arriving at an airport, as airline regulations require passengers to check in by certain times prior to the departure of a flight. This duration spans from 15 minutes to 2 hours depending on the destination and airline (with self check in, this can be expanded to 30 days, if checking in by online processes). During this process, the passenger often has the ability to ask for special accommodations such as seating preferences, inquire about flight or destination information, accumulate frequent flyer program miles, or pay for upgrades. The required time is sometimes written in the reservation, sometimes written somewhere in websites, and sometimes only referred as "passengers should allow sufficient time for check-in".

In-town check-in service is a service offered by some cities such as Abu Dhabi, Seoul, Hong Kong, Delhi, Kuala Lumpur, London, Vienna and Taipei, where passengers may check in luggage in designated places within the city but outside the airport. This reduces check-in time and queuing at the airport.

== Types ==
=== Destination or point ===
If passenger is checked in for only one sector of the flight, then it is called destination or point check-in.

=== Through ===
If a passenger is checked on all the onward flights and has boarding passes for all the connecting flights and bags are also through checked to the final destination i.e. passenger does not need to recheck themself and the baggage again on the transit, then the check-in is known as through check-in. A passenger can avail through check-in facility mostly when the travel is completely with one single airline.

== Passenger identity registration ==
At the time of check-in, one of the agent's primary duties is to check for valid documents. This includes tickets, passports, visas, letters of consent, and in some cases, passengers' address and contact details to comply with immigration requirements.

Some airlines may ask passengers to present the original credit card used for payment.

== Baggage registration ==
At the time of check-in, the passenger hands over baggage which is checked by the airport security and may be sealed (subject to the security regulations in that country). Anything that is above the weight limit or which is not allowed to be carried by the passenger themselves in the aircraft cabin is usually handed over to the agent at the time of check-in. The baggage allowance, if any, is prescribed by the airline and anything in excess may be refused or warrant additional surcharges, at the airline’s discretion.

=== Self-service bag drop ===
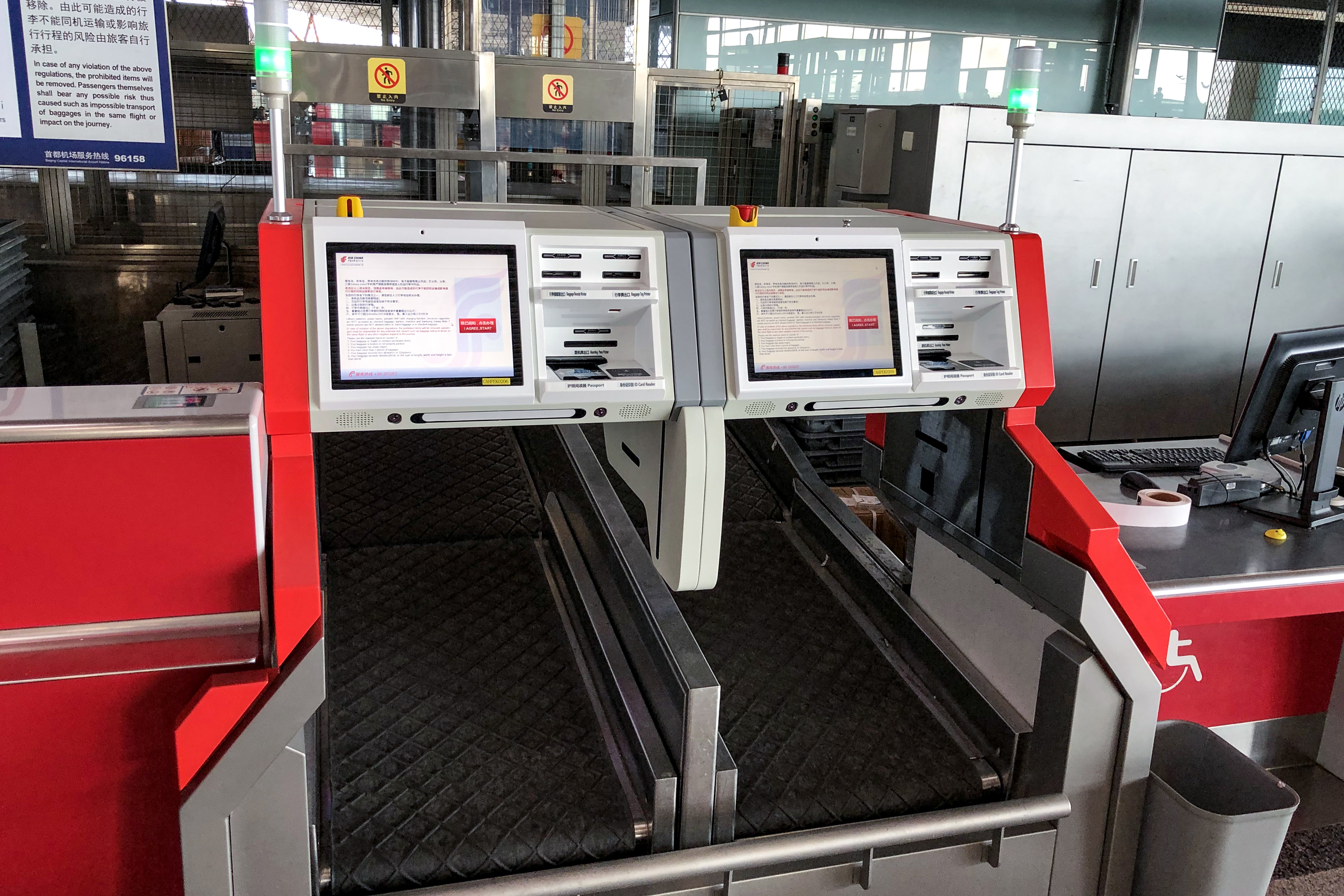
Self-service bag drop counter of Air China at Beijing Capital International Airport Terminal 3

Some airlines have a self-check-in process allowing passengers with bags to check-in at Self Bag Drop machines. Passengers then attach the baggage tag and drop the bag at the baggage drop belt. Passengers without checked luggage can go straight to the lounge (if entitled to lounge access) and check in at the kiosk there using their ePass (a small RFID device only for its premium customers) or proceed straight to the departure gate. Many airlines use electronic check-in such as ePass, mPass, or similar mobile apps, and these applications serve as the boarding pass.

=== Electronic bag tags ===
Electronic bag tags are designed to shorten the baggage check-in process, allowing passengers to pre-tag their luggage.

== Seating assignment ==
Usually at the time of check-in, an option of selecting a specific seat is offered, with passengers asked if they prefer a window or an aisle seat.

== Online check-in ==
Online check-in is the process in which passengers confirm their presence on a flight via the Internet and typically print their own boarding passes. Depending on the carrier and the specific flight, passengers may also enter details such as meal options and baggage quantities and select their preferred seating.

This service is generally promoted by the airlines to passengers as being easier and faster because it reduces the time a passenger would normally spend at an airport check-in counter. Some airlines, however, would still require passengers to proceed to a check-in counter at the airport, regardless of preferred check-in method, for document verification (e.g., to travel to countries where a visa is required, or to ensure the credit card used to purchase is genuine and/or matches the identity of the person who made the purchase). If passengers need to continue the check-in process at the airport after performing an online check-in, a special lane is typically offered to them to reduce wait times unless all desks are designated as baggage drop-off points. Furthermore, online check-in for a flight is often available earlier than its in-person counterpart. The process then transfers to passengers' control over their check-in. Airlines may use the system because self-service is frequently more efficient to operate, with a greater ability to cope with surges in passenger numbers. It also lessens activity at the airport, saving airlines money and reducing passenger waiting times.

Ryanair charges passengers a fee which can amount to 60 Euros for not using online check-in, except in certain limited circumstances. Furthermore, by the start of 2010, all passengers were required to check in online, therefore abolishing the use of check-in desks. Despite this, passengers are still charged to print their boarding cards out.

Online check-in is increasingly becoming required in other legacy carriers, particularly in Europe as the airport check-in desks are being relegated as baggage drop points only.

Alaska Airlines was the first to offer online check-in. The system was first offered on a limited basis starting in the second quarter of 1999, and was available to the general public on selected flights the following quarter. Since then, a growing number of airlines have introduced the system.

British Airways were the first airline to deploy online check-in globally having sealed approval from both the CAA (Civil Aviation Authority) and FAA (Federal Aviation Authority) for use of the 3-D Barcode technology.

Typically, web-based check-in for airline travel is offered on the airline's website not earlier than 24 hours before a flight's scheduled departure or seven days for Internet Check-In Assistant. However, some airlines allow a longer time, such as easyJet, which opens it 30 days beforehand. Depending on the airline, there can be benefits of better seating or upgrades to first class or business class offered to the first people to check in for a flight. In order to meet this demand, some sites have offered travelers the ability to request an airline check-in prior to the 24-hour window and receive airline boarding passes by email when available from the airline. Some airlines charge for the privilege of early check-in before the 24-hour window opens, thus capitalising on the demand for desirable seats such as those immediately behind a bulkhead or emergency exit row, such as Ryanair, which allow check-in up to 60 days before the flight for passengers who pay for a seat reservation.

=== Mobile check-in ===
In the mid-late 2000s, checking in was made possible using a passenger's mobile phone or PDA. A GPRS or 4G-capable smartphone or an internet-capable PDA is required in most instances (Finnair allows check-in by text message), and the check-in feature may be accessed by keying in a website on the mobile phone's browser or by downloading a dedicated application. The process is then similar to that which one would expect when checking in using a personal computer.

At the end of the mobile check-in process, some airlines send a mobile boarding pass to a passenger's mobile device, which can be scanned at the airport during security checks and boarding. However, others send an electronic confirmation with a barcode that can be presented to the staff at check-in or scanned at the kiosks to continue the check-in process (i.e., to have boarding passes issued).

One disadvantage of early check-in is that it puts a restriction on a person's agent changing their flight. As the ticket coupon has to be reset back to OPEN again prior to any changes being made, this may take some time to arrange.

== Premium check-in and lounge access ==
If the passenger carries a first or business class ticket or presents a certain frequent flyer program membership card (usually the higher-level tiers), or any other arrangements with the carrier, access to the premium check-in area and/or the lounge may be offered.

Premium check-in areas vary among airlines and airports. The main airport in which an airline hub is located normally offers a more thorough and exclusive premium check-in experience, normally inside a separate check-in lounge. For example, Air New Zealand's Auckland International premium check-in lounge provides a dedicated customs clearance counter and direct shortcut access to the security checkpoints. Airlines operating in minor airports generally offer an exclusive and separate premium check-in queue lane, often combined for its first, business, and/or premium economy passengers.

Singapore Airlines also offers this service to First Class and Suites passengers, whose flights depart Singapore Changi Airport's Terminal 3. These passengers have a dedicated curb side entrance and can wait at couches while staff assist them in checking-in. They are then led to a dedicated passport control counter.

Emirates provides its first-class/business-class customers with individual and separate check-in lane at its hub DXB, to divide most economy-class customers from main check-in lobby apart, and then ensuring those first-class/business-class customers' privacy.

SkyTeam provides the priority check-in service "SkyPriority", whose members could access the check-in counter to authorize the prioritized check-in service, along with the larger luggage capacity.

== In-town check-in ==
In some cities (including Dubai, Sharjah, Hong Kong, Kuala Lumpur, New Delhi, Chennai, Seoul, Vienna and Taipei), certain airlines provide in-town check-in services, allowing passengers to check their luggage at check-in counters located in downtown train stations or shopping malls as much as a day ahead of time. This service allows passengers to take a train or bus to the airport, often without the burden of carrying their checked luggage to the airport terminal:

airport served	in-town check-in location	airlines served	link to airport
HKG	Hong Kong Station	Cathay Pacific Airways, China Airlines, Hong Kong Airlines, Mandarin Airlines, Qantas, Singapore Airlines	MTR Airport Express
HKG	Kowloon Station	Cathay Pacific Airways, China Airlines, Hong Kong Airlines, Mandarin Airlines, Qantas, Singapore Airlines	MTR Airport Express
ICN	Seoul Station City Airport Terminal	Korean Air, Asiana Airlines, Jeju Air, T'way Air, Air Seoul, Air Busan, Jin Air, Eastar Jet	AREX Express
ICN	Gwangmyeong Station	Korean Air, Asiana Airlines, Jeju Air, T'way Air, Jin Air, Eastar Jet	KTX Airport Limousine Bus
KUL	Kuala Lumpur Sentral Station	Malaysia Airlines, Batik Air	KLIA Ekspres
TPE	Taipei Main Station	China Airlines, EVA Air, Starlux Airlines, Cathay Pacific Airways, Mandarin Airlines, Uni Air Note: Baggage check can only accept hard-sided luggage; not cartons, umbrellas, duffel bags, baby carriages, etc.	Taoyuan Metro
TPE	New Taipei Industrial Park metro station	China Airlines, EVA Air, Mandarin Airlines, Uni Air, Tigerair Taiwan Note: Baggage check can only accept hard-sided luggage; not cartons, umbrellas, duffel bags, baby carriages, etc.	Taoyuan Metro
CRK	SM City Clark	All Note: Baggage only weighed, tagged, and temporarily stored. Luggage must still be brought to and dropped off at the airport.	Clark Loop BRT
DXB	DIFC ICD Brookfield Place	Emirates Airlines	
DXB	Ajman Central Bus Station	Emirates Airlines	
DXB	Port Rashid Cruise Terminal 3	Emirates Airlines	
DXB	Dubai Harbour Terminals A and B	Emirates Airlines	

Also, elected airports in London (Heathrow and Gatwick), Frankfurt, Geneva, Vienna, and Zurich, people make use of baggage collection service such as Airportr where bags are collected from home.
