= Seoul Station City Airport Terminal =

In-town airport check-in service at Seoul Station

- 서울역 도심공항터미널
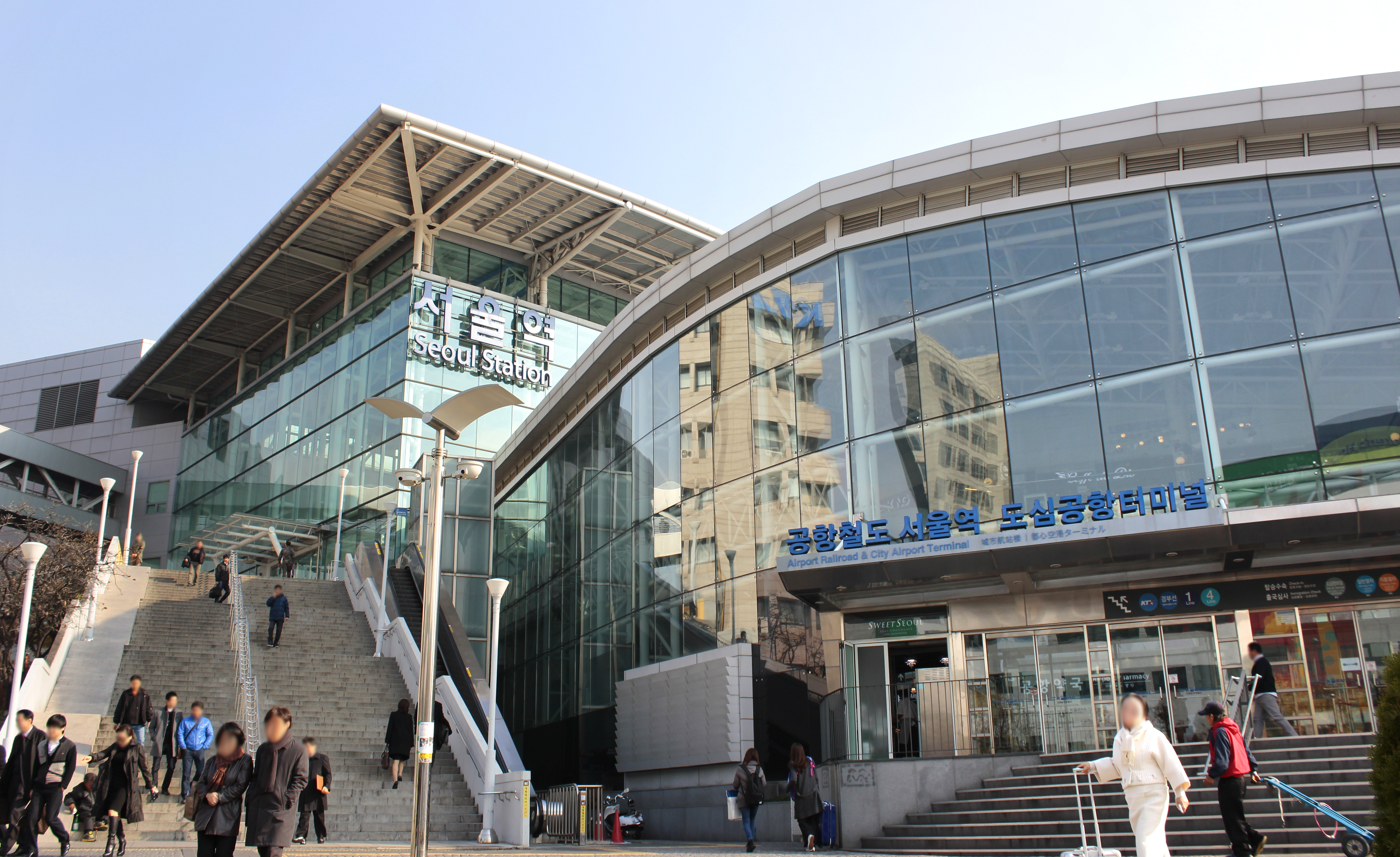
- Entrance to City Airport Terminal at ground floor of the Seoul Station
- Interactive map of the Seoul Station City Airport Terminal area

General information
- Type: In-city airport terminal (for In-town check-in)
- Location: 2nd basement floor, 378 Cheongpa-ro, Yongsan-gu, Seoul, South Korea
- Coordinates: 37.5537°N 126.9696°E
- Opened: 29 December 2010; 15 years ago
- Owner: AREX

Other information
- Public transit access: Seoul

The Seoul Station City Airport Terminal (SCAT) is a in-town early check-in service for passengers to the Incheon International Airport, located in the Seoul Station of Downtown Seoul, South Korea, operating from 29 December 2010 under AREX company. After the CALT closed its in-town check-in service operation at Gangnam in 2023, the Seoul City Terminal is the only available place in Seoul where in-town check-in service is provided.

In the Seoul Station City Airport Terminal, several designated airlines offer in-town early check-in service including luggage registration and hand over. From April 2024, there are nine airlines offering in-town check-in services at the Terminal; Korean Air, Asiana Airlines, Jeju Air, T'way Air, Air Seoul, Air Busan, Jin Air, Lufthansa, and Eastar Jet.

== Gallery ==
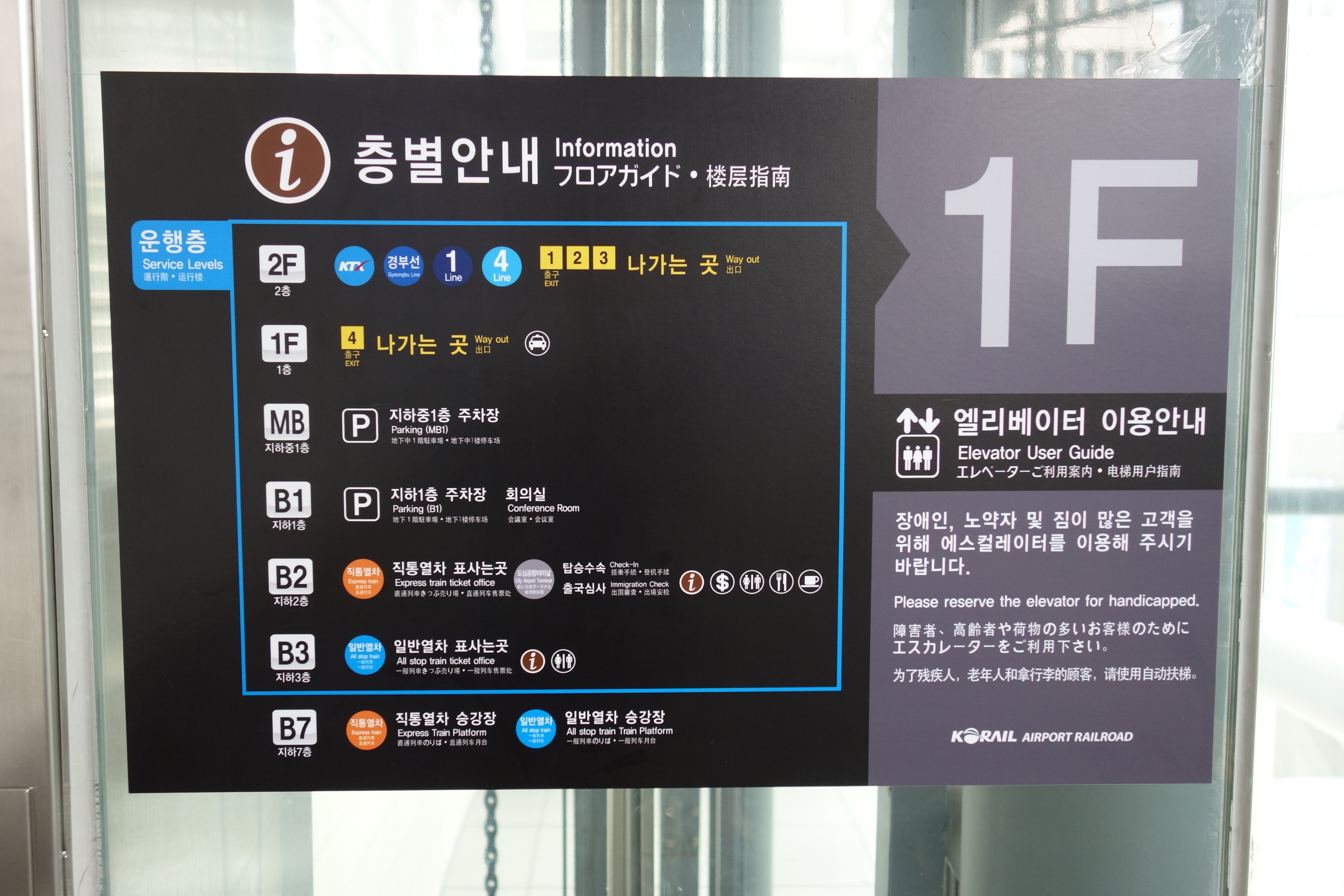
Information on location of the Terminal inside the Seoul Station

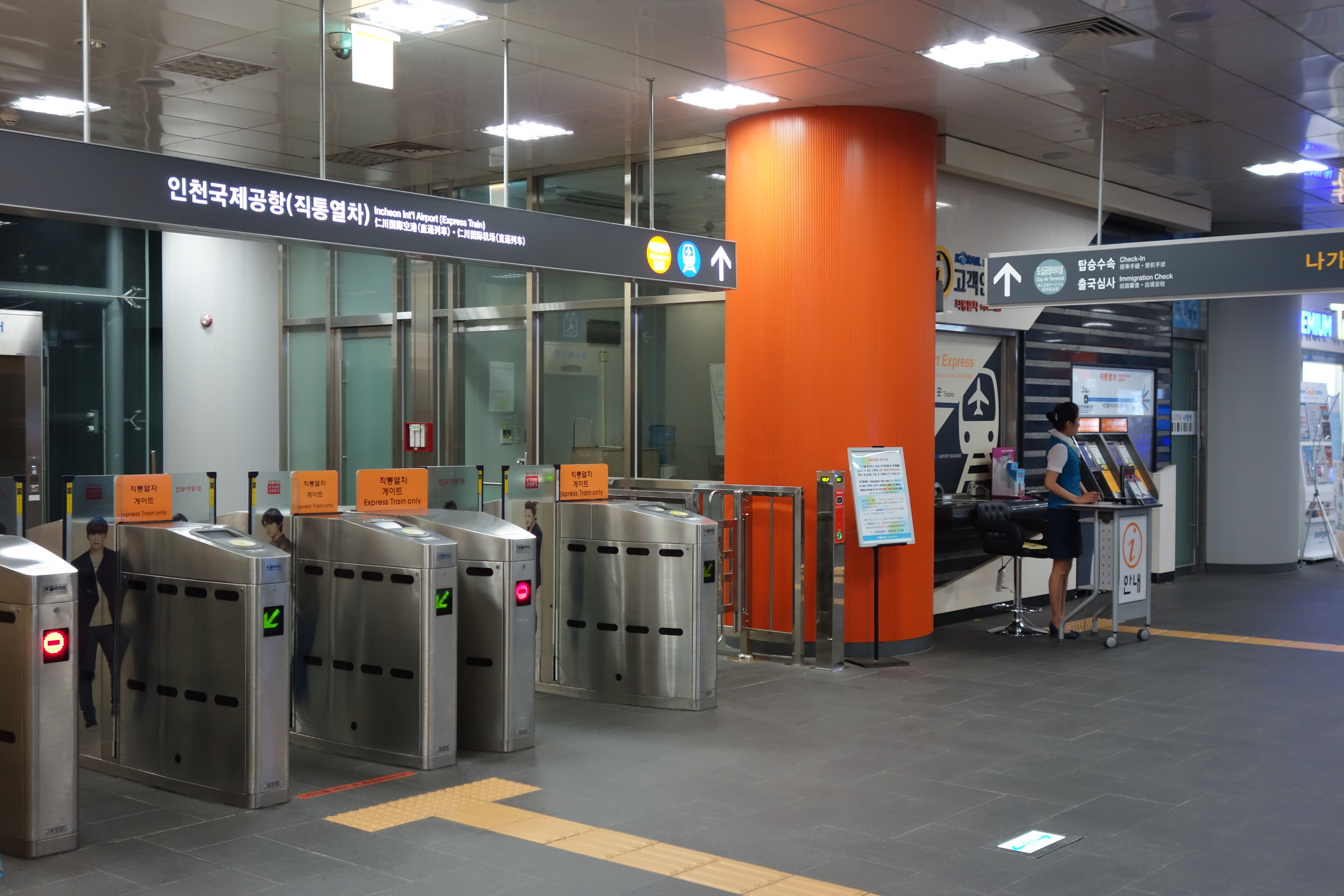
Entrance to the Seoul Station City Airport Terminal at Seoul Station 2nd basement floor

== See also ==
- AREX
- Seoul Station
- Airport check-in
- Incheon International Airport
