= Northwest Achievement Levels Test =

The Northwest Achievement Levels Test (NALT) is the paper version of the Computerized Achievement Levels Test, a test of student achievement.
