= Cellular component =

A ribosome is a biological machine that utilizes protein dynamics on nanoscales to translate RNA into proteins

Cellular components are the complex biomolecules and structures of which cells, and thus living organisms, are composed. Cells are the structural and functional units of life. The smallest organisms are single cells, while the largest organisms are assemblages of trillions of cells. DNA, double stranded macromolecule that carries the hereditary information of the cell and found in all living cells; each cell carries chromosome(s) having a distinctive DNA sequence.

Examples include macromolecules such as proteins and nucleic acids, biomolecular complexes such as a ribosome, and structures such as membranes, and organelles. While the majority of cellular components are located within the cell itself, some may exist in extracellular areas of an organism.

Cellular components may also be called biological matter or biological material. Most biological matter has the characteristics of soft matter, being governed by relatively small energies. All known life is made of biological matter. To be differentiated from other theoretical or fictional life forms, such life may be called carbon-based, cellular, organic, biological, or even simply living – as some definitions of life exclude hypothetical types of biochemistry.

== See also ==
- Cell (biology)
- Cell biology
- Biomolecule
- Organelle
- Tissue (biology)
