= Microfold cell =

Cell in gut capable of antigen uptake

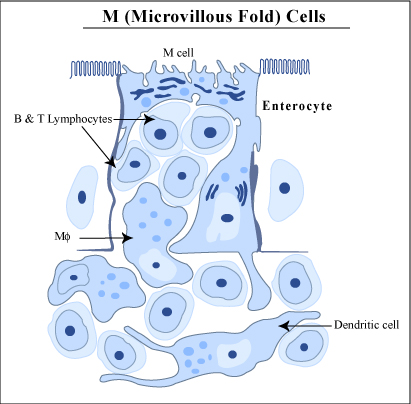
- M Cells: Enterocyte, Dendritic cell.

Details
- System: Immune system
- Location: Gut-associated lymphoid tissue (GALT) of the Peyer's patches in the small intestine, and in the mucosa-associated lymphoid tissue (MALT) of other parts of the gastrointestinal tract
- Function: Antigen uptake

Identifiers
- Latin: epitheliocytus microplicatus
- MeSH: D000092303
- TH: H3.04.03.0.00010
- FMA: 62929

Microfold cells (or M cells), also known as membranous cells in older literature are cells found in the gut-associated lymphoid tissue (GALT) of the Peyer's patches in the small intestine, and in the mucosa-associated lymphoid tissue (MALT) of other parts of the gastrointestinal tract. These cells are known to initiate mucosal immunity responses on the apical membrane of the M cells and allow for transport of microbes and particles across the epithelial cell layer from the gut lumen to the lamina propria where interactions with immune cells can take place.

Unlike their neighbor cells, M cells have the unique ability to take up antigen from the lumen of the small intestine via endocytosis, phagocytosis, or transcytosis. Antigens are delivered to antigen-presenting cells, such as dendritic cells, and B lymphocytes. M cells express the protease cathepsin E, similar to other antigen-presenting cells. This process takes place in a unique pocket-like structure on their basolateral side. Antigens are recognized via expression of cell surface receptors such as glycoprotein-2 (GP2) that detect and specifically bind to bacteria. Cellular prion protein (PrP) is another example of a cell surface receptor on M cells.

M cells lack microvilli but, like other epithelial cells, they are characterized by strong cell junctions. This provides a physical barrier that constitutes an important line of defense between the gut contents and the immune system of the host. Despite the epithelial barrier, some antigens are able to infiltrate the M cell barrier and infect the nearby epithelial cells or enter the gut.

== Structure ==
M cells are distinguished from other intestinal epithelial cells by their morphological differences. They are characterized by their short microvilli or lack of these protrusions on the cell surface. When they present microvilli, they are short, irregular, and present on the apical surface or pocket-like invagination on the basolateral surface of these cells. When they lack microvilli, they are characterized by their microfolds, and hence receive their commonly known name. These cells are far less abundant than enterocytes. These cells can also be identified by cytoskeletal and extracellular matrix components expressed at the edge of cells or on their cell surfaces, such as actin, villin, cytokeratin, and vimentin.

== Development ==
Factors promoting the differentiation of M cells have yet to be elucidated, but they are thought to develop in response to signals from immune cells found in developing Peyer's patches. B cells have been implicated in the developmental of M cells, since they are also localized in high numbers in the follicular-associated epithelium (FAE). FAE lacking B cell populations results in a decrease in the number of M cell lining the Peyer's patches. Similarly, a human lymphoma cell line is also known to undergo transition from adenocarcinoma cells to M cells.

Though many studies have shown various cell types directing the differentiation of M cells, new research characterizes the molecular pathways that guide M cell differentiation. More recently, through loss-of-function and rescue-phenotype studies, RANKL is shown to be a receptor activator of NF-κB ligand and play a role in differentiation of M cells. RANKL is expressed throughout the small intestine, facilitates uptake of pathogens such as Salmonella, and is the most critical factor M cell differentiation. Microbes found on intestinal epithelium are known to direct M cell development. For example, the type III secretion system effector protein SopB activates the transition of M cells from enterocytes. M cells undergo the differentiation process for up to four days before reaching full maturation. Recent studies have suggested they arise distinctly from the lymphoid and myeloid lineages.

Pathogens can take advantage of cell differentiation pathways in order to invade host cells. This is done by inducing differentiation of enterocytes into M cell type in gut epithelium. In one case, the SopB effector protein mentioned above is secreted to trigger fast differentiation of enterocytes localized in the FAE by initiation of epithelial to mesenchymal transition in these cells. When SopB activates differentiation of enterocytes, it acts via the activation of the Wnt/b-catenin signaling pathway and triggers the RANKL and its receptor, implicated in regulating cell apoptosis.

== Function ==
M cells do not secrete mucus or digestive enzymes, and have a thinner glycocalyx, which allows them to have easy access to the intestinal lumen for endocytosis of antigens. The main function of M cells is the selective endocytosis of antigens, and transporting them to intraepithelial macrophages and lymphocytes, which then migrate to lymph nodes where an immune response can be initiated.

=== Passive immunity ===
M cells play a role in passive immunity, or the transfer of active humoral immunity during and post pregnancy. Infants rely on antibodies specific to their mother's intestinal antigens, which move from the mother's gut and enter the breast milk. These antibodies are able to move into the milk supply through the lymphatic system. Even though the mechanism of this transport is not fully understood, it is hypothesized that dendritic cells and macrophages play the role of transport vehicles. In females that are not lactating, when M cells recognize antigen in the gut, they stimulate production of many Immunoglobulin A (IgA) antibodies. These antibodies are released into the gut mucosa, salivary glands, and lymph nodes. However, in females that are lactating, M cells recognize antigen and IgA is directed from the gut to the mammary gland. IgA traveling from the gut to breast milk supply is controlled by hormones, chemokines, and cytokines. Thus, the mammary gland and breast milk have critical roles alongside M cells in mucosal immune system.

== Clinical significance ==
M cells are exploited by several pathogenic gram-negative bacteria including Shigella flexneri, Salmonella typhimurium, and Yersinia pseudotuberculosis, as well as infectious prions, such as in bovine spongiform encephalitis (Mad-cow disease), as a way of penetrating the intestinal epithelium. Exploitation as a virulence factor depends upon the pathogen's ability to bind to M cells and thus guarantee penetration in that manner, as M cells sample intestinal contents. EPEC (see Pathogenic Escherichia coli) containing plasmids with genes for EAF (Escherichia coli adherence factor) will adhere to M cells. They are also exploited by viruses such as Polio and Reovirus for dissemination. CXCR4 tropic but not CCR5 tropic HIV has been noted to be able to bind to M cells and get transported across the epithelium by them.

== See also ==
- List of human cell types derived from the germ layers
