= Peyer's patch =

Lymphatic tissue in the lower small intestine

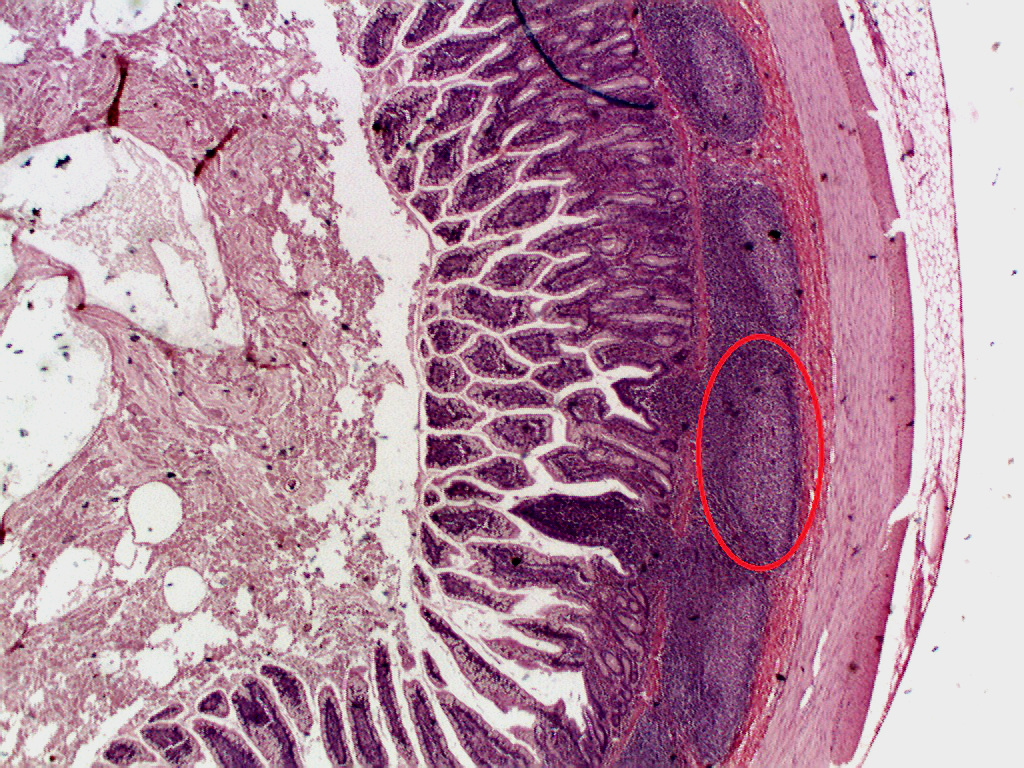
- Cross section of ileum with a Peyer's patch circled

Details
- System: Lymphatic system

Identifiers
- Latin: noduli lymphoidei aggregati
- MeSH: D010581
- TA98: A05.6.01.014; A05.7.02.009
- TA2: 2960, 2978
- TH: H3.04.03.0.00020
- FMA: 15054

Peyer's patches or aggregated lymphoid nodules are organized lymphoid follicles, named after the 17th-century Swiss anatomist Johann Conrad Peyer. They are an important part of gut associated lymphoid tissue usually found in humans in the lowest portion of the small intestine, mainly in the distal jejunum and the ileum, but also could be detected in the duodenum.

== History ==
Peyer's patches had been observed and described by several anatomists during the 17th century, but in 1677 Swiss anatomist Johann Conrad Peyer (1653–1712) described the patches so clearly that they were eventually named after him. However, Peyer believed they were glands that secreted something into the small intestine to facilitate digestion. It was not until 1850 that the Swiss physician Rudolph Oskar Ziegler (1828–1881) suggested, after careful microscopic examination, that Peyer's patches were actually lymph glands.

== Structure ==
Peyer's patches are observable as elongated thickenings of the intestinal mucosa measuring a few centimeters in length. About 100 are found in humans. Microscopically, Peyer's patches appear as oval or round lymphoid follicles (similar to lymph nodes) located in the mucosa layer of the ileum and extend into the submucosa layer. The number of Peyer's patches peaks at age 15–25 and then declines during adulthood. In the distal ileum, they are numerous and they form a lymphoid ring. At least 46% of Peyer's patches are concentrated in the distal 25 cm of ileum in humans. There are large variations in size, shape, and distribution of Peyer's patches from one individual to another one. In adults, B lymphocytes are seen to dominate the follicles' germinal centers. T lymphocytes are found in the zones between follicles. Among the mononuclear cells, CD4+/CD25+ (10%) cells and CD8+/CD25+ (5%) cells are more abundant in Peyer's patches than in the peripheral blood.

Peyer's patches are characterized by the follicle-associated epithelium (FAE), which covers all lymphoid follicles. FAE differs from typical small intestinal villus epithelium: it has fewer goblet cells therefore mucus layer is thinner, and it is also characterized by the presence of specialized M cells or microfold cells, which provide uptake and transport of antigens from lumen. Moreover, basal lamina of follicle-associated epithelium is more porous compared to intestinal villus. Finally, follicle-associated epithelium is less permeable for ions and macromolecules, basically due to higher expression of tight junction proteins.

== Function ==
Because the lumen of the gastrointestinal tract is exposed to the external environment, much of it is populated with potentially pathogenic microorganisms. In order to facilitate proper immune recognition and response to potential invaders, Peyer’s patches function as primary inductive sites for antibody production in the gut, specifically IgA. Germinal centers within the patches contain IgA+ B-cells, which differentiate into antibody producing plasma cells, supporting antigen specific and high affinity IgA responses. Peyer's patches thus establish their importance in the immune surveillance of the intestinal lumen and in facilitating production of the immune response within the mucosa.

Pathogenic microorganisms and other antigens entering the intestinal tract encounter macrophages, dendritic cells, B-lymphocytes, and T-lymphocytes found in Peyer's patches and other sites of gut-associated lymphoid tissue (GALT). Mechanistically, activated B-cells in Peyer’s patches form active germinal centers, supported by CD4 T cells, promoting IgA production. Subsequently, activated B-cells migrate to the subepithelial dome, where they interact with antigen-presenting dendritic cells. These interactions promote transforming growth factor beta (TGF-β) signaling, which is required for class switching recombination from IgM to IgA and the generation of IgA committed B-cells that subsequently differentiate into plasma cells. Peyer's patches thus act for the gastrointestinal system much as the tonsils act for the respiratory system, trapping foreign particles, surveilling them, and destroying them. Despite these immune functions, Peyer's patches are distinct from other secondary lymphoid organs, as mice treated with CD122-targeted interleukin-2 (IL-2) complexes, which are normally associated with activation of immune cell populations, displayed reductions in Peyer's patch cellularity, specifically increased B-cell apoptosis. Although B-cell populations recovered after treatment ended, these findings may provide insight into the role that Peyer's patches may play in gastrointestinal diseases.

Structurally, Peyer's patches are covered by a special follicle-associated epithelium that contains specialized cells called microfold cells (M cells) which sample antigen directly from the lumen and deliver it to antigen-presenting cells (located in a unique pocket-like structure on their basolateral side). Dendritic cells and macrophages can also directly sample the lumen by extending dendrites through transcellular M cell-specific pores. From this sampling, microbial components stimulate dendritic cells within Peyer’s patches. Once stimulated, the dendritic cells produce nitric oxide, retinoic acid, and IL-6, signals enhancing IgA isotype switching in B-cells, promoting IgA production within Peyer’s patches. At the same time the paracellular pathway of follicle-associated epithelium is closed tightly to prevent penetration of antigens and continuous contact with immune cells. T cells, B-cells and memory cells are stimulated upon encountering antigen in Peyer's patches. These cells then pass to the mesenteric lymph nodes where the immune response is amplified. Activated lymphocytes pass into the blood stream via the thoracic duct and travel to the gut where they carry out their final effector functions. The maturation of B-lymphocytes takes place in the Peyer's patch.

== Clinical significance ==
Although important in the immune response, excessive growth of lymphoid tissue in Peyer's patches is pathologic, as hypertrophy of Peyer's patches has been closely associated with idiopathic intussusception.

Having too many or larger than normal Peyer's patches is associated with an increased risk of prion diseases, and intussusception in children. A history of viral illness is a risk factor for enlarged or inflamed Peyer's patches.

Salmonella typhi and poliovirus also target this section of the intestine.

Disturbances in the gut microbiota and immune regulation within Peyer's patches are implicated in the pathogenesis of diseases, such as Crohn's disease, where chronic inflammation can arise due to overactive immune responses. As Peyer's patches are packed with immune cells and produce protective proteins such as secretory IgA to maintain gut balance, their dysfunction can trigger inappropriate immune responses, driving the inflammation and tissue damage.

== See also ==
- Influenza
- Lung cancer
