= Epstein–Barr virus–associated lymphoproliferative diseases =

Group of disorders

- Other names: EBV-associated lymphoproliferative diseases
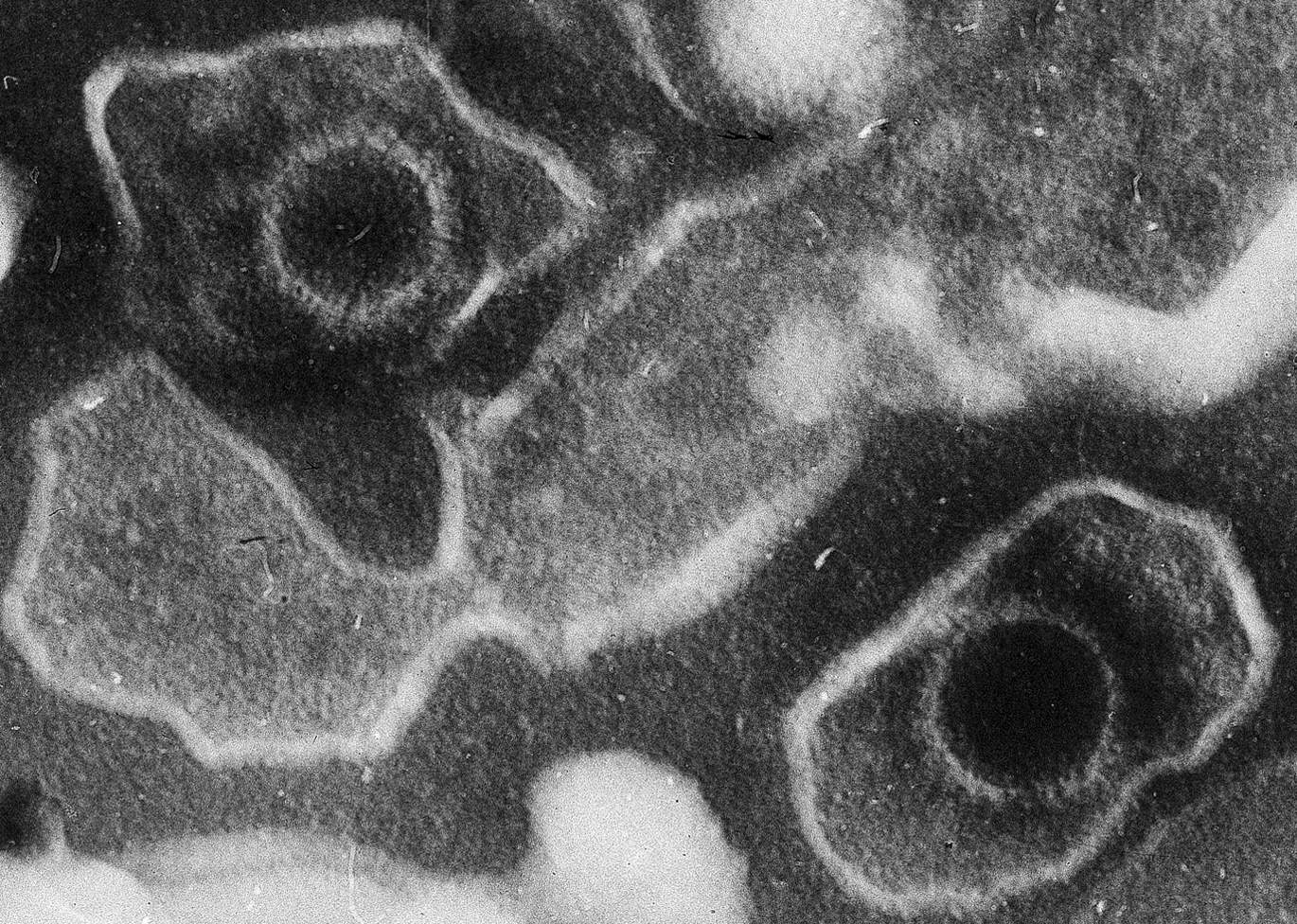
- Electron micrograph of two Epstein–Barr virions (viral particles) showing round capsids loosely surrounded by the membrane envelope
- Specialty: Hematology, oncology, infectious disease, virology
- Causes: Epstein–Barr virus

Epstein–Barr virus–associated lymphoproliferative diseases (also abbreviated EBV-associated lymphoproliferative diseases or EBV+ LPD) are a group of disorders in which one or more types of lymphoid cells (a type of white blood cell), i.e. B cells, T cells, NK cells, and histiocytic-dendritic cells, are infected with the Epstein–Barr virus (EBV). This causes the infected cells to divide excessively, and is associated with the development of various non-cancerous, pre-cancerous, and cancerous lymphoproliferative disorders (LPDs). These LPDs include the well-known disorder occurring during the initial infection with the EBV, infectious mononucleosis, and the large number of subsequent disorders that may occur thereafter. The virus is usually involved in the development and/or progression of these LPDs although in some cases it may be an "innocent" bystander, i.e. present in, but not contributing to, the disease.

EBV-associated LPDs are a subcategory of EBV-associated diseases. Non-LPD that have significant percentages of cases associated with EBV infection (see Epstein–Barr virus infection) include the immune disorders of multiple sclerosis and systemic lupus erythematosus; malignancies such as stomach cancers, soft tissue sarcomas, leiomyosarcoma, and undifferentiated nasopharyngeal cancer; the childhood disorders of Alice in Wonderland syndrome; and acute cerebellar ataxia.

About 50% of all five-year-old children and 90% of adults have evidence of previous infection with EBV. During the initial infection, the virus may cause infectious mononucleosis, only minor non-specific symptoms, or no symptoms. Regardless of this, the virus enters a latency phase in its host and the infected individual becomes a lifetime asymptomatic carrier of EBV. Weeks, months, years, or decades thereafter, a small percentage of these carriers, particularly those with an immunodeficiency, develop an EBV+ LPD. Worldwide, EBV infection is associated with 1% to 1.5% of all cancers. The vast majority of these EBV-associated cancers are LPD. The non-malignant, premalignant, and malignant forms of EBV+ LPD have a huge impact on world health.

The classification and nomenclature of the LPD reported here follow the revisions made by the World Health Organization in 2016. This classification divides EBV+ LPD into five categories: EBV-associated reactive lymphoid proliferations, EBV-associated B cell lymphoproliferative disorders, EBV-associated NK/T cell lymphoproliferative disorders, EBV-associated immunodeficiency-related lymphoproliferative disorders, and EBV-associated histiocytic-dendritic disorders.

== Pathophysiology ==
=== Lymphoid cells involved in EBV+ LPD ===
In the "germinal center model" for the normal maturation of B cells, naive B cells enter the germinal centers of lymph nodes and other lymphoid tissues and in the process of becoming competent for producing functional antibodies, mature into lymphoblasts, centroblasts, centrocytes, memory B cells, and ultimately plasma cells. During this maturation, the B cells rearrange their immunoglobulin genes at multiple sites. The first lymphoid cell type invaded by EBV is the naïve B cell. Following this invasion, the virus express genes that control this cell's advance through these maturation stages; it can force the naïve B cell that it infects to: arrest maturation at any of these stages; become undetectable as an infected cell by the host's immune system; proliferate excessively; and develop into a B cell-based LPD. The virus may also exit the B cell it initially infects; invade T- or NK cells; and cause these cells to avoid detection by the immune system, proliferate, and progress to a T- or NK cell-based LPD. The T cells that may become infected by EBV are natural killer T cells (NK cells), Gamma delta T cells (γδ T cells), cytotoxic T cells (CTL), helper T cells (T_{h} cells), and follicular B helper T cells (T_{FH} cells). The means by which EBV establishes a dendritic-histiocytic cell (i.e. follicular dendritic cell) infection are unclear. Follicular dendritic cells are connective tissue rather than lymphoid cells. They do, however, have a surface membrane receptor, CD21 (also known as complement receptor type 2), which EBV uses to enter B cells. EBV may escape their infected B cell to invade follicular dendritic cells through this CD21 entry pathway. However, it is also thought possible that the EBV may direct its infected lymphoid cell to mature into an apparent follicular dendritic cell.

=== Epstein–Barr virus infection ===
The Epstein–Barr virus (also termed human herpesvirus 4) belongs to the Herpes family of Group I double-stranded DNA viruses. It is spread by transfer from the oral/nasal secretions of an infected individual to the oral cavity of an uninfected individual. Once in the oral cavity, the virus invades, reproduces in, establishes its lytic phase in, and lyses (i.e. bursts open) epithelial cells that line the oral mucosa of the newly infected individual. The freed virus then invades naïve B cells located in submucosal lymphoid tissue e.g. tonsils or adenoids. Here, it establishes either a lytic phase that allows it to infect other lymphoid cells or expresses genes that suppress the lytic cycle and impose one of four latency phases. Initially, the virus establishes latency III by expressing nuclear proteins encoded by its EBNA-1, -2, -3A, -3B, -3C, LP, LMP-1, -2A, and -2B and BART genes; cell surface membrane proteins encoded by its LMP-1, -2A, and 3A genes; and microRNAs encoded by its EBER-1 and EBER-2 genes. The products of these genes immortalize, promote the growth and survival, and regulate the maturation of the infected B cell. However, products of some latency III genes (particularly the viral cell surface proteins) make the infected cell susceptible to attack by the host's immune system. The virus avoids this by limiting expression of its latency genes to EBNA-1, LMP-1, -2A, -2B, some BARTs, and the two EBERs. This Latency II pattern of gene expression continues the infected cells' immortalization and proliferation, helps the cells escape the immune surveillance, and forces them to differentiate (i.e. mature) into memory B cells. EBV may establish and maintain a Latency I state in its infected memory B cells by expressing only EBNA1 and the two EBER genes. The products of the latter genes keep the virus in a mostly dormant state. Finally, EBV may establish and maintain a Latency 0 phase by expressing only EBER genes. In latency 0, EBV is in memory B cells as fully dormant, non-reproductive viruses but in this, as in all of the other latency phases, it can revert to its lytic phase. The following table gives more information on the actions of the EBV latency genes.

EBV product	Latency	Function
EBNA-1	III, II, I	Promote replication of the viral genome; controls the infected cell's expression of nuclear and surface membrane proteins that regulate the virus's latency phases.
EBNA-2	III	Induces expression of the virus's LMP gene and ~300 genes of the infected cell (e.g. the MYC proto-oncogene) which promote this cell's proliferation, survival, and malignancy; required for the malignant transformation of this cell.
EBNA-3A	III	Represses expression of the infected cell's p16^{INK4a} protein thereby promoting its proliferation; represses expression the infected cell's BCL2L11 protein thereby inhibiting apoptosis to promote this cell's survival.
EBNA-3B	III	Inhibits the infected cell's proliferation; attracts lymphoid cells to its infected cell; inactivates promoters of its infected cell's genes possibly thereby causing this cell more able to evade the host's immune system and to become malignant.
EBNA-3C	III	Required for the malignant transformation of infected cells; along with EBNA-3A, represses the infected cell's p16^{INK4a} and BCL2L11 proteins thereby promoting, respectively, this cell's proliferation and repressing its apoptosis; disturbs cell cycle checkpoints in the infected cell to promote its proliferation or locking it in the non-reproductive cell cycle state of G_{1}.
EBNA-LP	III	Overcomes the innate immune responses of infected cells to promote the virus's survival; acts with EBNA-2 to promote the malignant transformation of its infected cells.
LMP-1	III, II	Induces the expression of the infected cell's NF-κB and BCL2 proteins thereby blocking this cells apoptosis and stimulating its proliferation; regulates the infected cell's maturation.
LMP-2A	III, II	Prevents the establishment of EBV's lytic cycle; stimulates the infected cell's AKT and B cell receptor proteins thereby blocking this cell's apoptosis and promoting its survival and proliferation.
LMP-2B	III, II	Inhibits the ability of the virus's LMP-2A protein to establish EBV's lytic cycle; stimulates the infected host cell's AKT and B cell receptor proteins thereby blocking this cell's apoptosis and promoting its survival and proliferation.
BART microRNAs	III, II, I	While abundantly expressed, the functions of BART microRNAs are unclear; may help evade the infected cell avoid attack by uninfected T- and NK-cells or modify the infected cell's notch signaling pathway to promote its proliferation; not required for EBV-induced B cell immortalization or malignant transformation.
EBER1/2 nuclear RNAs	III, II, I, 0	Abundantly expressed by EBV-infected cells in all latency stages; causes infected cell to produce interleukin 10 which may promote this cell to proliferate and avoid attack by host cytotoxic T cells; may block apoptosis in the infected cell.

== EBV-associated reactive lymphoid proliferations ==
EBV-associated reactive lymphoid proliferations are a set of disorders in which B cells or NK/T cells proliferate as an apparent reaction to EBV infection. They are usually self-limiting, non-malignant disorders but have a variable possibility of progressing to a malignant lymphoproliferative disease.

=== Epstein–Barr virus-positive reactive lymphoid hyperplasia ===
EBV-positive reactive lymphoid hyperplasia (or EBV-positive reactive lymphoid proliferation) is a benign form of lymphadenopathy, i.e. swollen, often painful lymph nodes. The disorder is based on histologic findings that occur in the lymphoid tissue of mainly older individuals who were infected with EBV many years earlier. Immunodeficient individuals of any age may also have the disorder. In immunologically normal individuals, histologic findings include the presence of small B cells located in the extrafollicular or, rarely, the follicular area of normal or minimally hyperplastic lymph nodes. These cells are commonly EBV+, express EBER viral genes, and carry the virus in its latency I or II phase. These cells may also occur in the bone marrow. Individuals who are immunodeficient because of disease, immunosuppressive drugs, or old age immunosenescence may exhibit a more pronounced hyperplasia of affected nodes, higher numbers of EBV+ cells, and a more disseminated disorder termed polymorphic lymphoproliferative disorder. These disorders almost always resolve spontaneously but in very rare cases progress over months or years to EBV+ Hodgkin lymphoma or EBV+ diffuse large B-cell lymphoma of the elderly.

=== Epstein–Barr virus-positive infectious mononucleosis ===
Infectious mononucleosis (IM) is caused by EBV in ~90% of cases; the remaining cases are caused by human cytomegalovirus, adenovirus, or toxoplasma. HIV, rubella, and Hepatitis viruses A, B, and C can produce an illness resembling IM. The acute EBV infection is usually asymptomatic or mild in children <5 years old whereas 25–75% of adolescents and adults develop overt IM after infection. The signs and symptoms of IM occur within weeks of EBV infection. Most cases involve a self-limiting flu-like illness or a mild to moderate illness of fever, sore throat, enlarged, painful lymph nodes in the head and neck, and/or an enlarged spleen. These manifestations usually abate within six weeks. More severe cases persist beyond six weeks and may be accompanied by uncommon but serious complications such as hepatitis, anemia, thrombocytopenia, hemophagocytosis, meningoencephalitis, myocarditis, pericarditis, pneumonitis, parotitis, pancreatitis and, in rare but extremely severe cases, life-threatening complications such as rupture of the spleen or disease-transitions to other LPD such as hemophagocytic lymphohistiocytosis (HLH), chronic active EBV (CAEBV), or lymphoma.

During the infection's acute phase, individuals generally have high levels of infective EBV in their oral/nasal secretions plus high blood levels of EBV, atypical lymphocytes, CD8 T cells, and memory B cells (up to 50% of the latter cells are EBV+). The tonsils and cervical lymph nodes in these cases are hyperplasic and contain mixtures of normal-appearing lymphocytes, activated lymphocytes, plasma cells, and Reed–Sternberg-like cells. Many of these normal-appearing and activated B cells and a small percentage of the tissue's T and NK cells are EBV+ with the virus being mostly in its lytic cycle rather than latent phases. The diagnosis of mild IM cases is often overlooked or made based on clinical and routine laboratory findings. These cases as well as asymptomatic and more severe cases of EBV infection are diagnosed definitively as EBV-associated by finding during the initial infection period the Epstein–Barr virus, IgM antibody to EBV viral-capsid antigen (VCA-IgM), IgG antibody to VCA (IgG-VCA), and IgG antibody to EBV viral-capsid antigen (EBNA1-IgG) in the blood and/or finding EBV in the oral/nasal secretions. There are no controlled studies on the treatment of uncomplicated EBV+ IM. Short-term courses of corticosteroid drugs are often prescribed for patients with airways obstruction, autoimmune reactions (e.g. autoimmune anemia or thrombocytopenia), or other complications of the disease. Treatment of these and the severest IM cases generally use regimens directed at the specific features of each type of complication.

=== Epstein–Barr virus-related hemophagocytic lymphohistiocytosis ===
Hemophagocytic lymphohistiocytosis (HLH) is a rare disorder characterized by a systemic inflammatory or, in extreme cases, overwhelming cytokine storm condition. It is due to the pathological proliferation and activation of benign histiocytes, macrophages, and lymphocytes along with the excessive release of proinflammatory cytokines by these cells. HLH has two distinct types. Primary HLH (also termed genetic or familial HLH) is caused by loss of function (i.e. inactivating) mutations in genes that cytotoxic T and/or NK cells use to kill targeted cells such as those infected with EBV. These include mutations in the UNC13D, STX11, RAB27A, STXBP2, and LYST genes that encode elements needed for these cells to discharge toxic proteins into targeted cells; mutations in the PFP gene that encodes one of these toxic protein, perforin 1; and mutations in the SH2D1A, BIRC4, ITK1, CD27, and MAGT1 genes that encode proteins required for the development, survival, and/or other cell-killing functions of cytotoxic T and/or NK cells.

Secondary HLH is associated with and thought to be promoted by malignant and non-malignant diseases that, like primary HLH, also weaken the immune system's ability to attack EBV-infected cells. Malignant disorders associated with secondary HLH include T-cell lymphoma, B-cell lymphoma, acute lymphocytic leukemia, acute myeloid leukemia, and the myelodysplastic syndrome. Non-malignant disorders associated with secondary HLH include: autoimmune disorders such as juvenile idiopathic arthritis, juvenile Kawasaki disease, systemic lupus erythematosus, the juvenile onset and adult onset forms of Still's disease, and rheumatoid arthritis; immunodeficiency disorders such as severe combined immunodeficiency, DiGeorge syndrome, Wiskott–Aldrich syndrome, ataxia telangiectasia, and dyskeratosis congenita); and infections caused by EBV, cytomegalovirus, HIV/AIDS, bacteria, protozoa, and fungi. Secondary HLH may also result from iatrogenic causes such as bone marrow or other organ transplantation; chemotherapy; or therapy with immunosuppressing agents; About 33% of all HLH cases, ~75% of Asian HLH cases, and nearly 100% of HLH cases caused by mutations in SH2D1A (see X-linked lymphoproliferative disease type 1) are associated with, and thought triggered or promoted by, EBV infection. These cases are termed EBV-positive hemophagocytic lymphohistiocytosis (EBV+ HLH). In EBV+ HLH, the virus may be found in B cells but mainly infects NK and T cells, including cytotoxic T cells. The virus induces defects in the ability of cytotoxic T cells to kill other EBV-infected cells and causes them to overproduce pro-inflammatory cytokines. These cytokines stimulate histiocyte and macrophage development, activation, proliferation, and cytokine production. The excessive release of these cytokines (e.g. tumor necrosis factor-α, interferon-γ, Interleukin 1 beta, interleukin 18, and CXCL9) causes a systemic and often overwhelming inflammatory condition.

Primary HLH is most often seen in Asians <4 years of age while secondary HLH is most often seen in older children and adults of various races. Typically, the disorder presents with fever, decreased numbers of circulating white blood cells and/or platelets, enlarged liver and/or spleen, clinical evidence of hepatitis, and/or central nervous system disturbances such as irritability, decreased levels of consciousness, seizures, meningitis (i.e. neck stiffness, photophobia, and headache), impaired cranial nerve function, hemiplegia, ataxia (i.e. poor coordination of complex muscle movements), and reduced muscle tone. Laboratory studies show abnormal liver function tests, reduced levels of blood fibrinogen, impaired blood clotting, and high levels of blood ferritin, triglycerides, soluble interleukin-2 receptor, and, in EBV+ HLH cases, circulating EBV. In the latter cases, histological examination of lymphatic, bone marrow, liver, neuronal, and other involved tissues show infiltrations of small EBV+ T cells, scattered small bystander EBV+ B cells, reactive histiocytes, reactive macrophages, and, in ~70% of cases, hemophagocytosis, i.e. ingestion of erythrocytes, leukocytes, platelets, and/or their precursor cells by histiocytes and macrophages. (Evidence of hemophagocytosis is not critical for the diagnosis of HLH.) The EBV in infected lymphocytes is in its lytic cycle rather than any latent phase. Criteria consistent with the diagnosis of HLH, as developed by the Histiocytic Society (2004), include finding five of the eight following signs or symptoms: fever ≥38.5 °C; splenomegaly; low blood levels of any two of the following, hemoglobin (<10 mg/L), platelets (<100,000/μL), or neutrophils <1,000/μl; either one or both of the following, blood fasting triglyceride levels >265 mg/dL or fibrinogen levels <150 mg/dL; hemophagocytosis in lymphoid tissue; low or absent NK cell activity as tested in vitro on blood cell isolates; elevated blood levels of ferritin; and elevated blood levels or the soluble IL-2 receptor. The finding of EBV in T cells of blood or involved tissues is required to diagnose the EBV-associated disease.

Prior to 1994, the treatments used for HLH were generally unsuccessful with average response rates to therapeutic interventions of ~10% and median survival times of ~12 month. In 1994, the Histiocytic Society established a drug regimen of dexamethasone + etoposide that increased the response rate to 70%. This regimen is currently recommended, particularly for primary HLH in young children, as induction therapy for EBV+ HLH except in patients with the macrophage activation syndrome where pulse methylprednisolone is the preferred treatment. Response rates are somewhat higher in young children than adults and in primary rather than secondary disease. Following inductive therapy, allogenic hematopoietic stem cell transplantation preceded by a reduced intensity conditioning regimen has been employed selectively, particularly in cases with primary HLH, with early results reporting some success. The management of EBV+ HLH has been less successful than that for other causes of secondary HLH. Novel approaches to HLH particularly in cases of refractory or recurrent disease include the use of antithymocyte globulin, the DEP regimen (i.e. liposomal doxorubicin, etoposide, methylprednisolone), an anti-interferon gamma monoclonal antibody, and, particularly in patients with EBV+-HLH, rituximab.

=== Chronic active Epstein–Barr virus infection ===
Chronic active Epstein–Barr virus infection (CAEBV) (also termed chronic active EBV infection of T and NK cells, systemic form) is a rare LPD of children and, less often, adults. CAEBV presents as severe, persistent form of infectious mononucleosis (IM) or a severe LPD disorder that follows months to years after a symptomatic (i.e. IM) or asymptomatic EBV infection. Characteristic findings that are also diagnostic criteria for the disorder are: 1) symptoms similar to those in infectious mononucleosis but persist for >3 months; 2) high blood levels of EBV DNA (i.e. >25 viral copies per mg of total DNA); 3) histologic evidence of organ disease; 4) presence of EBV RNA (e.g. an EBER) in an affected organ or tissue; and 5) occurrence of these findings in individuals who do not have a known immunodeficiency, malignancy, or autoimmune disorder. Other symptoms of CAEBV include persistent or intermittent fever, enlargement of lymph nodes, spleen, and/or liver, severe mosquito bite allergy, rashes, herpes virus-like skin blistering, diarrhea, and uveitis. The disorder may take a protracted course without progression over several years or a fulminant course with life-threatening complications such as Hemophagocytosis (i.e. ingestion of blood cells by histiocytes), myocarditis, liver failure, interstitial pneumonia, or rupture of the intestines. CAEBV can progress to a malignant type of EBV+ T-cell LPD such as aggressive NK cell leukemia, NK/T cell leukemia, or peripheral T cell lymphoma.

The disorder may involve EBV+ T, NK, or, rarely, B cells. In EBV+ T and NK cell-associated disease, the tissues affected by CAEBV usually exhibit an histology that is not suggestive of a malignancy: lymph nodes have areas of hyperplasia, focal necrosis, and small granulomas; spleen shows atrophy of white pulp with congested red pulp; liver contains infiltrations of small lymphocytes around portal vasculature and sinuses; and lung and heart have findings typical of interstitial pneumonitis and viral myocarditis, respectively. Erythrophagocytosis (i.e. ingestion of red blood cells by histiocytes) often occurs in the bone marrow, spleen, and/or liver. The principal EBV+ cells in these tissues are T cells in ~59%, both T- and NK cells in ~40%, and B cells in ~2% of cases. The involved lymphoid tissues in EBV+ B cell cases contain proliferating Immunoblasts (i.e. activated B cells), plasma cells, and Reed-Sternberg-lide cells. The EBV+ cells in CAEB express primarily LMP1, LMP2, and EBNA1 viral proteins and EBER microRNAs, suggesting that the virus is in its latency II phase. The mechanism underlying the development of CAEBV is unclear. However, patients with CAEBV have a hyper-inflammatory condition with elevated blood levels of the same cytokines (i.e. IL-1β, IL-10, and IFNγ) seen in hemophagocytic lymphohistiocytosis. Furthermore, the disease has a strong racial preferences for Eastern Asians. These associations suggest that there are strong genetic predispositions involved in the disease's development and that this development is driven by T- and/or NK cell production of inflammatory cytokines.

Initially, CAEBV may assume a relatively indolent course with exacerbations and recoveries. However, the disease almost invariably develops lethal complications such as single or multiple organ failures. Current recommendations based on studies in Japan suggest that patients diagnosed with CAEBV be treated early in their disease with an intensive three-step sequential regimen: 1) immunotherapy (prednisolone, cyclosporine A, and etoposide; 2) cytoreduction (vincristine, cyclophosphamide, pirarubicin, and prednisolone or, alternatively, prednisolone and cyclosporine A); and 3) reconstruction: allogeneic hematopoietic stem cell transplant preceded by reduced intensity drug conditioning (i.e. etoposide and cytosine arabinoside followed by fludarabine, melphalan, anti-thymocyte globulin, methylprednisolone, and etoposide). Patients receiving this regimen obtained unusually high three-year event-free and overall survival rates of >87%. Further studies are required to determine how long these event-free and overall survival rates endure.

==== Severe mosquito bite allergy ====
Severe mosquito bite allergy (SMBA) is a rare disorder which occurs mainly in young East Asians (median age 6.7 years). In most cases, it is a manifestation of CAEBV infection of the EBV+ NK cell type: ~33% of all individuals with CAEBV develop this allergy. SMBA has also been reported to occur in rare cases of EBV positive Hodgkin disease, hydroa vacciniforme, aggressive NK‐cell leukemia (also termed aggressive NK-cell leukemia/lymphoma), and extranodal NK/T-cell lymphoma, nasal type, as well as in EBV negative LPD such as chronic lymphocytic leukemia and mantle cell lymphoma. EBV+ SMBA is a hypersensitivity reaction. In CAEV, the best studied or the predispositions to the disorder, SMBA is characterized by the development of skin redness, swelling, ulcers, necrosis and/or scarring at the site of a mosquito bite. This is often accompanied by fever and malaise; enlarged lymph nodes, liver, and/or spleen; liver dysfunction; hematuria; and proteinuria. Affected individuals have increased blood levels of immunoglobulin E (which plays an essential role in the development of type I hypersensitivity reactions of the skin and other tissues) and EBV+ NK cells. In severer cases, the disorder is complicated by hemophagocytosis, NK/T-cell lymphoma, or aggressive NK cell leukemia. Diagnostically, the skin lesions show infiltrating NK cells in the epidermis and subcutaneous tissue with a small fraction of these cells being EBV+ with the virus in its latency II phase. A very high density of EBV+ NK cells in these lesions suggests the disorder has progressed to NK/T cell lymphoma or NK cell leukemia. While the disorder's etiology is unclear, it is thought that the mosquito salivary gland allergenic proteins trigger reactivation of EBV in latently infected NK cells. Upon reactivation, EBV genes such as LMP1 express products that induce immortalization, proliferation, and in some cases malignancy of the EBV reactivated NK cells. The best treatment for SMBA remains unclear. Mild and clearly uncomplicated cases can be treated conservatively focusing on obtaining relief of symptoms such as skin irritation, fever, and malaise. However, cases with evidence of significant complications of CAEFV such as the development of hemophagocytosis, NK/T cell lymphoma, or aggressive NK cell lymphoma, support the use of the chemotherapeutic regimens directed at these complications. Cases of EBV+ SMBA associated with clear evidence of concurrent aggressive CAEBV have been treated with relative success by the three-step regimen used to treat CAEBV. Rare cases of SMBA have been reported to occur in individuals who have no apparent predisposing disease but later develop CAEBV. Such cases require careful evaluation and follow-up for development of a predisposing disorder.

==== Hydroa vacciniforme-like lymphoproliferative disease ====
Hydroa vacciniforme is a rare photodermatitis reaction in which sunlight causes itchy skin papules and vesicles that develop crusts and eventually become scarred tissue. The lesions occur primarily on the sun-exposed skin of the face and back of the hand. It is an EBV+ disorder in which most cases develop in children, follow a waxing and waning course, and resolve in early adulthood. However, the disorder can occur in adults. Furthermore, the disease in children or adults may progress to cause severe, extensive, and disfiguring skin lesions unrelated to sunlight exposure, facial edema, and systemic manifestations such as fever, weight loss, and enlargements of lymph nodes, liver, and/or spleen. These cases may progress to an EBV+ LPD such as T cell lymphoma, T cell leukemia, B cell lymphoma, or B cell leukemia. The milder and more aggressive forms of hydroa vacciniforme were initially termed classic hydroa vacciniforme and hydroa vacciniforme-like lymphoma, respectively, but extensive overlap between the two disease types lead the 2016 World Health Organization to reclassify them into a single disorder termed Hydroa vacciniforme-like lymphoproliferative disease and to be a subcategory of CAEBV. Histological examination of the skin lesions reveals infiltrating lymphocytes most of which are T cells and a minority of which are NK- or B- cells. In the skin lesions, EBV occurs primarily in the T cells and to a lesser extent NK cells. Marker studies indicate that the EBV in these cells is in latency phase II.

Treatment of the non-aggressive cases of hydroa vaccinforme-like lymphoproliferative disease follow standard dermatological practices for non-malignant diseases. For malignant cases of the disease, Immunotherapeutic drugs prednisone, interferon-α, chloroquine, and thalidomide) have given temporary remissions and improvements; standard chemotherapy and radiotherapy regimens used to treat lymphoma and leukemia have produced only transient benefits while often causing unacceptable toxicities. Cases of EBV+ hydroa vacciniforme-like lymphoproliferative disease associated with clear evidence of concurrent CAEBV have been treated with relative success by the three-step regimen used to treat CAEBV.

=== Epstein–Barr virus-positive mucocutaneous ulcer ===
EBV+ mucocutaneous ulcer is a rare lymphoproliferative disorder in which infiltrating B cells cause solitary, well-circumscribed ulcers in mucous membranes and skin. The disorder affects individuals who have poor immune function because of old age, immunosuppressant diseases (e.g. HIV/AIDS), immunosuppressive drug therapy, or allogenic hematopoietic stem cell transplantation. Immunosuppressive drugs associated with the development of these ulcers include methotrexate (the most often cited drug causing the disease), cyclosporin A, azathioprine, mycophenolate, TNF inhibitors, tacrolimus, and topical steroids. It is thought that the reduce efficacy of immune surveillance associated with these predisposing conditions or treatments maintain EBV in a dormant state systemically but not where EBV+ B cells are prevalent, i.e. in afflicted mucous membranes and skin. Consequently, the EBV+ cells at these sites proliferate and destroy tissue to create ulcerating lesions.

Persons developing these ulcers are usually elderly. Their ulcers are typically isolated, occur in the oral mucosa and less commonly in skin or gastrointestinal tract mucosa. Besides pain at the ulcer site and local tissue destruction (which may be severe), individuals with EBV+ mucocutaneous ulcer are symptomless and lack lymphadenopathy (i.e. enlarged and painful lymph nodes), involvement in other tissues, or B symptoms. However, ulcers in the gastrointestinal tract may present with a variety of abdominal symptoms including acute emergency perforations. Unlike most other forms of EBV+LPD, EBV-associated mucocutanious ulcers are generally not associated with detectable blood levels of EBV. Microscopically, the ulcers consist of lymphocytes, including EBV+ B cells, sometimes a scattering of other EBV+ lymphoid cell types, and histiocytes, plasma cells, eosinophils, and scattered large immunoblasts which may closely resemble but are not the Reed–Sternberg cells seen in Hodgkin lymphoma. These Reed-Sternberg–like cells are EBV+ B cells that express the tumor marker cell surface membrane protein, CD30, the B cell surface membrane marker, CD20, and the proteins typical of the EBV replication cycle latency II or III phase.

In elderly individuals with no other cause for immunosuppression, EBV+ mucocutaneous disease may exhibit a relapsing and remitting course with their ulcers worsening but then regressing spontaneously. Persistent and/or severely symptomatic cases have had excellent responses to rituximab, a commercial monoclonal antibody directed against the CD20 protein present on B cells. Individuals developing these ulcers as a consequence of immunosuppressive therapy for other diseases generally have a remission after the dosages of the drugs used in their immunosuppressive treatment regimens are reduced. Most of these patients do not experience a relapse.

== EBV+ B cell lymphoproliferative diseases ==
After its initial entry into B cells, the Epstein–Barr virus infects other B cells and in doing so may or may not cause a symptomatic disease viz., infectious mononucleosis. In either case, the virus soon switches to its dormant, viral latency 0 phase within memory B cells and the infected individual becomes an asymptomatic, lifelong EBV carrier. At any time thereafter, however, the virus may reactivate, enter either its lytic cycle, latency phase II, or latency phase III; spread to other lymphoid cells, and drive its infected cells to proliferate excessively, survive abnormally, and establish an EBV+ LPD.

=== Epstein–Barr virus-positive Burkitt lymphoma ===
Burkitt lymphoma occurs in three forms. Epidemic Burkitt lymphoma (eBL) is common in Africa, the Middle East, Brazil, Papua New Guinea, and other areas where malaria is endemic. It usually presents in children 4–7 years old and in almost all cases is associated with EBV infection. Sporadic Burkitt lymphoma (sBL) is rare. It occurs in children and, less commonly, older (>60 years) adults. It is found primarily in Northern and Eastern Europe, East Asia, and North America. There are ~1,200 cases/year in the USA. Only 10–15% of sBL cases are associated with EBV infection. The immunodeficiency-related form of Burkitt lymphoma (iBL) strikes 30–40% of individuals with HIV-induced AIDS and rare cases of patients who received a bone marrow or other organ transplant; in the latter cases, individuals have almost always received intensive chemotherapy and therefore are immunodeficient. About 30% of iBL cases are infected with EBV.

eBL commonly presents with a jaw mass; periorbital swelling due to an orbital tumor; or an abdominal mass caused by a tumor in the retroperitoneum, kidney, or ovary. Less commonly, it present as a sudden onset of paraplegia or urinary incontinence due to tumor infiltration into neural tissue. sBL commonly presents with abdominal pain, nausea, vomiting, and/or gastrointestinal bleeding caused by the growth of an abdominal tumor; a head or neck tumor in lymph nodes, tonsils, nose, sinuses, and/or oropharynx); or extensive bone marrow infiltrations by malignant tumor cells. iBL commonly presents with fever, other constitutional symptoms, and tumors in the gastrointestinal tract, bone marrow, liver, lung, and central nervous system. Histologic examination of BL-involved tissues shows infiltrations by a uniform population of rapidly proliferating (i.e. mitotic index approaching 100%) and rapidly turning over (i.e. cells not only rapidly proliferate but also rapidly die due to apoptosis) lymphocytes punctuated by intermittent clear spaces where macrophages containing ingested dead cells give the tissues the impression of a "starry sky" pattern. The lymphocytes are primarily B cells (e.g., express CD20 and CD10 markers) with rare T cells evident only in the background. The B cells are derived mostly from germinal center B cells, contain EBV in latency I phase, and express high levels of EBNA1 and EBER viral products. Some cases also express other EBNA and the LMP2A products. EBNA1 and EBER proteins may contribute to the development and/or progression of BL by inhibiting the death by apoptosis of the cells they infect while the product of LMP2A may activate the infected cell's PI3K cell signaling pathway thereby stimulating this cell's proliferation.

The malignant B cells in all three forms of BL commonly have acquired chromosomal translocations involving their MYC gene. MYC is a proto-oncogene (i.e. a cancer-causing gene if appropriately mutated or overexpressed) located on the long ("q") arm of human chromosome 8 at position 24 (i.e. at 8q24). In ~90% of BL cases, MYC is translocated to the IGH (i.e. Immunoglobulin heavy chain) gene locus at position 14q32, the IGK (i.e. immunoglobulin kappa light chain) gene at position 2p12 ("p" stands for short chromosome arm), or the IGL (i.e. immunoglobulin lambda light chain) gene at position 22q11. These translocations bring MYC under the transcriptional control of these antibody-forming loci and thereby cause the MYC product, Myc to be overexpressed and continuously driving the infected cell to proliferate. Mutations in other genes of the infected cell may promote its malignancy, e.g. ~30% of BL cases harbor B cell P53 gene mutations which may promote cell survival. These alternate, potentially EBV-independent routes to malignancy and the fact that some BL cases do not involve EBV allow that many cases of EBV+ BL are not caused and/or promoted by EBV: the ubiquitous virus is the likely cause of almost all cases of eBL but be an innocent passenger virus in many cases of sBL and iBL.

Patients with any of the three forms of BL (with or without an association with EBV) are treated with multiple drug chemotherapy regimens. While past studies found much better results in children than adults using this approach, recent studies report that more aggressive chemotherapy regimens that include the intrathecal administration of drugs give better results. The COCOX-M-IVAC regimen (systemic cyclophosphamide, vincristine, doxorubicin, and high-dose methotrexate alternating with ifosfamide, etoposide, and cytarabine plus intrathecal methotrexate and cytarabine) give event-free two-year response rates of >90% in both children and adults. Addition of rituximab, a monoclonal antibody against the CD20 antigen expressed on B cells, may be added to this or other multiple drug regimens. Autologous stem cell bone marrow transplantation has not improved the results of these regimens. Treatment of HIV-associated iBL is similar to, and has success rates comparable, to non-HIV BL, particularly when coupled with treatment directed at HIV although adults >40 years old have had poorer responses to these regimens. Cases refractory to these regimens have a poor prognosis with average overall three-year survival rates of ~7%.

=== Epstein–Barr virus-positive lymphomatoid granulomatosis ===
EBV+ lymphomatoid granulomatosis (EBV+ LG, also termed lymphomatoid granulomatosis [LG]) is a rare disease that involves malignant B cells and reactive, non-malignant T cells; it is almost always EBV+. This LPD occurs primarily in middle aged males (male:female ratio 2:1). EBV+ LG usually (~90% of cases) presents as a lung disorder with coughing, hemoptysis, shortness of breath, and chest X-rays showing multiple nodular lesions at the base of both lungs. It may also evidence signs and symptoms caused by nodular or infiltrative lesions in the skin, central nervous system, kidney, liver, and/or peripheral nervous system, At presentation the disease usually does not involve lymph nodes. In rare cases it may not even involve the lung. The lesions in EBV+ LG consist of occasional large, atypical B cells located in a background of numerous reactive CD4+ Helper T cells, plasma cells, macrophages, and variable numbers of large atypical lymphoid cells which resemble immunoblasts, plasmablasts, or Reed–Sternberg cells. The lesions often center around and evidence destruction of small blood vessels but, paradoxically, do not contain well‑formed granulomas. Only the lymphoid B cells in the lesions are EBV+; these cells express LMP1 and EBNA2 viral proteins and therefore carry EBV in its latency III phase.

Individuals with the disease may be immune deficient due to subtle reductions in their immune function or, based on individual case reports, immunodeficiency diseases such as HIV/AIDS, common variable immunodeficiency, X-linked agammaglobulinemia, hypogammaglobulinemia, sarcoidosis, methotrexate-treated rheumatoid arthritis, or the Wiskott–Aldrich syndrome. They may also have, again based on case reports, a history of inflammatory/autoimmune diseases such as chronic hepatitis, ulcerative colitis, retroperitoneal fibrosis, or primary biliary cholangitis. EBV+ LG may progress to or become complicated by the non-malignant skin disease, lymphomatoid papulosis, or a second lymphoid malignancy such as Hodgkin lymphoma, mycosis fungoides, CD30+ anaplastic large cell lymphoma, follicular lymphoma, chronic lymphocytic leukemia, or diffuse large B cell lymphoma. EBV+ LG appears in part due to the virus causing its infected B cell to release chemokines which attract, and thereby stimulate T cells to injure tissues, particularly blood vessels. Impaired host immune function and failure of infected cells to express viral proteins recognized by cytotoxic T cells allows EBV+ B cells to evade the immune system and proliferate.

LG presents as one of three grades based on the histology of biopsied tissues: grade I (<5 EBV+ cells per high power microscopic field (hpf), no atypical cells/hpf, and minimal necrosis); grade II (5–20 EBV+ cells/hpf, occasional atypical cells/hpf, and moderate necrosis); and grade III (>20 EBV+ cells/hpf, predominance of atypical cells/hpf, and extensive necrosis). Grade I disease may not need therapy and, in rare cases, remits spontaneously. Grade II and severe grade I disease is treated with immune regimens that include various interferons and/or rituximab, a monoclonal antibody against the B cell protein, CD20. Grade III and severe grade II disease are treated with either high dose glucocorticoids; chemotherapy regimens such as CHOP, ICE, or Hyper-CVAD; or combinations of these treatments. However, the efficacy of interferon-α and rituximab in EBV+G is disputed.) While EBV+ LG often responds to these treatments, there are no controlled clinical trials proving their long-term therapeutic value. Medium survival times for all cases of the disease are ~4 years with many cases progressing to other lymphoid malignancies that shorten survival times.

=== Epstein–Barr virus-positive Hodgkin lymphoma ===
Hodgkin lymphoma (HL) falls into two histologic forms, nodular lymphocyte predominant Hodgkin lymphoma (NLPHL) and classical Hodgkin lymphoma (cHL) with cHL being divided into nodular sclerosis (NSHD), mixed cellularity (MCHD), lymphocyte rich (LRHD), and lymphocyte depleted (LDHD) subtypes. EBV is found in 30% to 50% of HL cases, but occurs in ~90% of NSHD and MCHD but ≤10% of LRHD, LPHD, or NLPHD cases. HL involves the infiltration of T cells, B cells, macrophages, eosinophils, fibroblasts, and Reed–Sternberg cells (HRS cells, also termed Hodgkin Reed-Sternberg cells) into lymphoid and other tissues. HRS cells are large mono- or poly-nuclear cells which: 1) derive from lymph node and/or spleen germinal center B cells; 2) may contain EBV and viral products indicative of stage II latency; and 3) are the only malignant cells in, and the mediators of, HD. EBV in HRS cells are thought to play a role in the pathogenesis (i.e. development) of EBV+ HL. These cells express uniquely high levels of the virus's LMP1 gene. This gene product protein, LMP1, mimics activated human TNF receptors (e.g. CD40, CD40, and RANK) in continuously stimulating the NF-κB, PI3K and JAK-STAT signaling pathways which promote cell proliferation, survival, and production of cytokines that may suppress the EBV's lytic cycle to maintain the HRS cells viability. HRS cells also express the virus's LMP2A gene protein product which mimics the human BCR gene product) in promoting the survival of its parent cells. And, EBV, by undefined mechanisms, causes crippling mutations in the HRS cell's rearranged immunoglobulin G genes to prevent them from expressing immunoglobulins and inducing them to secrete cytokines which recruit the other cited cell types into the EBV+HL's pathological infiltrates. This helps create a local environment conducive for HRS cells to evade the immune system and proliferate.

EBV+ HL is more prevalent in young children and young adults but can occur in those over 80 years old, perhaps because of old age-related deterioration in immune system function, infectious diseases, or malnutrition. The incidence of EBV+ HD's in individuals with HIV/AIDS is also high, ~10-fold greater than the general population, but the causes for this is unclear. The presentation of EBV+ HL is similar to that of EBV-HL, e.g. fever, night sweats, weight loss in the setting of swollen lymph nodes, and/or evidence of tumor invasion of other tissues. Treatment of the EBV+ HD is also similar to EBV- HD and offers cure rates approaching 90%, although some population based studies have found a higher incidence of relatively adverse outcomes in older individuals with EBV+ HL.

=== Epstein–Barr virus-positive diffuse large B cell lymphoma, not otherwise specified ===
Diffuse large B-cell lymphoma (DLBCL) is the second most common type of lymphoma. It occurs primarily in elderly adults, far less frequency in younger adults, and rarely in children. Elderly adults present with B symptoms (i.e. fever, night sweats, and weight loss), swollen lymph nodes, and symptoms due to malignant cell infiltrations into the upper gastrointestinal tract, lungs, upper airways, and/or other organs. Younger individuals present with swollen lymph nodes but frequently do not have class B symptoms or involvement of extra-nodal tissues. It is a more aggressive disease in the elderly. Histologic features of DLBCL can be divided into three patterns based on the cell types in tissue infiltrates; the anaplastic variant (~3% of cases) exhibits prominent Reed–Sternberg-like cells embedded in a background of histiocytes and lymphocytes; the immunoblastic variant (8–10% of cases) has 90% immunoblasts; and the centroblastic variant (80% of cases) is dominated by centroblasts. These histological features are typically accompanied by the invasion and destruction (i.e. necrosis) of small blood vessels. An alternative classification is based on the disease's cell of origin: germinal center B cell DLBCL (GCB-DLBCL) and activated B cell DLBCL (ABC-DLBCL). Uncommonly, DLBCL occurs by what is known as a Richter transformation of chronic lymphocytic leukemia (CLL) to an extremely aggressive form of DLBCL. Many of these transformations develop in EBV-associated CLL cases (~10–15% of all CLL cases are EBV-associated).

About 10–15% of DLBCL cases are EBV+. These cases, termed Epstein–Barr virus-positive (EBV+) diffuse large B cell lymphoma, not otherwise specified (EBV+ DLBCL), occur predominantly in East Asia and Mexico and less commonly in Europe and the USA. EBV+ DLBCL is distinguished from DLBCL (often termed diffuse large B-cell lymphoma, not otherwise specified, i.e. DLBCL, NOS) in that virtually all the large B cells in the tissue infiltrates of the EBV+ disease type express EBV genes characteristic of the virus's latency III (common in the elderly) or II (common in younger patients) phase. These large B cells in EBV+ DLBCL are centroblastic (i.e. activated) B-cells that express EBERs, LMP1, EBNA1, EBNA2, and other viral proteins; in >50% of cases, they also express classic B cell antigenic proteins such as CD20, BCL6, and CD15. The viral proteins may be responsible for activating their infected cells' NF-κB, STAT/JAK, NOD-like receptor, and Toll-like receptor cell signaling pathways which may act to promote the proliferation and survival of the infected cells.

EBV+ DLBCL commonly occurs in immune-deficient individuals. It is thought to arise in the elderly because of their immunosenescence as manifested by an age-related decline in the specific types of CD4+ and CD8+ lymphocytes that function to suppress the growth of EBV+ cells. EBV+ DLBCL also occurs in individuals who are overtly immunosuppressed due to HIV/AIDS (~33% of HIV/AIDS cases are EBV+) or anti-rejection drug therapy following solid organ transplantation (30% to 70% or these cases are EBV+). Similarly, the Richter transformation of EBV+ CLL to EBV+ DLBCL occurs primarily in CLL cases treated with immunosuppressant drugs and therefore appears due in part to immunosuppression-related reactivation of the latent EBV infecting these CLL cells. Currant treatments for EBV+ and EBV- DLBCL use either R-CHOP (rituximab, chimeric anti-CD20 monoclonal antibody, cyclophosphamide, doxorubicin, vincristine, and prednisone or R-EPOCH rituximab, etoposide, prednisolone, vincristine, cyclophosphamide, and doxorubicin (R-EPOCH). Responses to these regimens are poor in EBV+ DLBCL (median survival two years), particularly in CLL-transformed EBV+ DLBCL (median survival four months).

==== Epstein–Barr virus–associated diffuse large B cell lymphoma associated with chronic inflammation ====
Diffuse large cell lymphoma associated with chronic inflammation (DLBCL-CI) is an extremely rare EBV-positive DLBCL that arises as a mass in areas of longstanding inflammation, usually body cavities or narrow spaces. Almost all of the reported cases of DLBCL involve pyothorax-associated lymphoma (PAL). PAL occurs years after a pneumothorax is medically induced in order to collapse a lobe or entire lung around a cavity or to treat pleurisy (inflammation of the pleural cavity) caused by an otherwise uncontrollable condition, almost always pulmonary tuberculosis. Reports on it are primarily in Japanese elderly males. Far less commonly, DLBCL-CI occurs in association with other chronic inflammation conditions such as osteomyelitis, medical insertion of a foreign body (intrauterine contraceptive devices, metallic implants, surgical mesh), skin ulcers, and venous ulcers. Signs and symptoms of DLBCL-CI reflect the destructive effects of the malignancy in the affected areas. The infiltrative lesions consist of diffuse large EBV+ B cells in latency III amidst a variety of benign, EBV-negative chronic inflammatory white blood cells. The EBV+ large B cells in these lesions often have reduced expression of the CD20 antigen and contain genetic abnormalities such as mutations in P53, overexpression of Myc, and deletion of TNFAIP3. These abnormalities differ from those in the EBV+ large B cells of ordinary DLBCL. Studies suggest that the disease arises as the result of the EBV-driven proliferation of large B cells in a confined anatomical space that segregates them from immune surveillance. and/or of EBV-driven release of cytokines with anti-inflammatory activity (e.g. Interleukin 6 and Interleukin 10) that may also help the infected cells escape this surveillance.

While DLBCL-CI is an aggressive malignancy, its treatment, particularly in localized disease, should include efforts to remove its underlying inflammatory causes. For example, PAL is a particularly aggressive form of DLBCL-CI. Nonetheless, surgical removal of the pleural tumor effectively treats the few cases in which it is localized and of low-grade. More severe cases of PAL have been treated with chemotherapy regimens such as CHOP but overall five-year survival rates with these regimens have been poor (~21%). There are too few reports on the treatment of non-PAF forms of DLBCL-CI to make recommendations.

===== Fibrin-associated diffuse large B cell lymphoma =====
Fibrin-associated diffuse large B cell lymphoma (FA-DLBCL) is included as a provisional entry as a type of DLBCL-CI by the World Health Organization, 2016. It is an extremely rare disease that occurs in immunologically competent individuals. It is due to the infiltration of large B cells into long-standing, avascular fibrin-based masses that develop in, on, or around long-standing hamartomas, pseudocysts, cardiac myxomas, prosthetic heart valves, thrombus-laden in endovascular grafts, hematomas, hydroceles, and prosthetic implants of the hip. The infiltrations consist of sheets, ribbons, or clusters of proliferating large B cells within avascular tissue that are coated with or contain abundant fibrin plus a paucity or absence of other types of inflammatory cells. The large B cells are infected with EBV in latency III and express this virus's EBER, EBNA2, and LMP-1 genes. The infiltrations typically do not spread beyond these initial sites and there is no evidence of lymph node, spleen, or other tissue involvement: FA-DLBCL appears to be a non-malignant proliferation of EBV+ large B cells. Similar to DLBCL-CI, the development of FA-DLDCL may be due to localized immune suppression at its sites of origin. Unlike DLBCL-CI, however, the large B cells in FA-DLBCL appear unable to proliferate and survive long-term outside of the sequestered sites; consequently, the EBV+ cells tend to spread beyond these sequestered sits and FA-DKBCL does not appear to be a truly malignant disease. The two disorders also have other differences: the histology of the involved tissues in FA-DLBCL and DLBCL-CI are dissimilar and the large EBV+ B cells in FA-DLBCL, unlike those in DLBCL-CI, do not overexpress the Myc gene and have relatively few karyotype chromosomal abnormalities.

Patients with FA-DLBCL present with signs and symptoms reflecting the location of the infiltrative lesion. When these lesions occupy the heart (e.g. on myxomas or prosthetic valves) or vasculature (e.g. on thrombus-laden vascular grafts) the disease may present as a life-threatening cardiovascular symptoms, particularly strokes. Outside of these cardiovascular complications, the disease typically takes an indolent course without spreading beyond its site of origin. Removal of the tissues along with any associated foreign implant is usually curative. Refractory or recurrent disease has been treated with the CHOP (± rituximab) with only limited success.

=== Epstein–Barr virus-positive human herpes virus 8-associated B cell lymphoproliferative disorders ===
Human herpes virus 8 (HHV8) is associated with four rare lymphoproliferative disorders: 1) a subset of diffuse large B cell lymphoma (DLBCL), b) large B-cell lymphoma arising in HHV8-associated multicentric Castleman's disease, c) primary effusion lymphoma, and 4) germinotropic lymphoproliferative disorder. The latter two forms of HHV8+ lymphoproliferative disorders have been associated in rare case reports with EBV infection.

==== Primary effusion lymphoma ====
Primary effusion lymphoma (PEL) is a HHV8+ B cell lymphoma presenting as an effusion (i.e. excess fluid) in the pleural cavity (see pleural effusion), peritoneal cavity (see peritoneal effusion), or pericardium (see pericardial effusion). These effusions are due to the infiltration of HHV8-infected B cells into the membrane tissues that line these spaces. Tumor masses are infrequent and generally occur late in the disease. PEL is an aggressive, rapidly proliferating lymphoma that commonly spreads to multiple organs adjacent to the involved membrane tissues. Diagnosis of the diseases requires evidence of HHV8 virus involvement by detecting the HHV8 viral protein, LANA-1, in the malignant B cells. PEL occurs primarily in individuals who are immunodeficient due to HIV/AIDS infection or solid organ transplantation. EBV is found in the malignant HHV8+ B cells of ~70% of PEL patients. However, a role for EBV in the development of PEL is not supported since HHV8 appears to drive the development and progression of the disease. Treatment of PEL with surgery, radiation, chemotherapy (e.g. CHOP or EPOCH drug regimens), antiviral agents, and/or experimental drugs (e.g. rituximab, bortezomib) have not given results that are sufficiently beneficial to make clear recommendations. PEL reportedly has a median overall survival time of 4.8 months and one-, three-, and five-year overall survival rates of 30%, 18%, and 17%, respectively.

==== Epstein–Barr virus-positive, human herpes virus-positive germinotropic lymphoproliferative disorder ====
Human herpes virus-positive germinotropic lymphoproliferative disorder (HHV+ GLPD) is an extremely rare disorder characterized by the localized swelling of lymph nodes due to the infiltration by plasmablasts (i.e. immature plasma cells). The disorder generally occurs in immune-competent individuals although it has been reported to occur in HIV-positive individuals. In most cases, the involved lymph nodes have a normal architecture with clusters of plasmablasts that are not only HHV8+ but also EBV+ with EBV likely being in its latency I phase. In the few cases reported, the disorder has shown good to excellent responses to chemotherapy. However, too few cases have been reported to make therapy recommendations or to define the role, if any, of EBV in the disorder.

=== Epstein–Barr virus-positive plasmablastic lymphoma ===
Plasmablastic lymphoma (PBL) is an uncommon lymphoma that occurs mostly in immune-deficient individuals, primarily those with HIV/AIDS. Indeed, it is an AIDS-defining clinical condition. The disease can also occur in those who have had an organ transplantation or chemotherapy treatment or are presumed to have age-related immune senescence. Chronic autoimmune or inflammatory diseases (e.g. rheumatoid arthritis, Graves' disease, Giant-cell arteritis, sarcoidosis, or severe psoriasis) may also underlie development of PBL. The disease occurs in individuals (male:female ratio 4:1) of all ages, typically presenting as a tumor of the head, neck, oral cavity or sinuses; less common sites include the gastrointestinal tract, skin, and other tissues. Histologically, the tumors are classified as monomorphic PBL (consisting predominantly of immunoblastic cells) or plasmacytic PBL (consisting predominantly of cells with features of plasma cells at varying stages of development). While originating from B cells, these cells express plasma cell markers such as CD79a, IR4, BLIMP1, CD38, and CD138. About 70% of PBL cases are EBV+, with most of the lymphoma cells expressing EBV genes indicating that this virus is in latency phase 0 or I. The disease appears to develop and progress as a result of the actions of both the EPV and human immunodeficiency virus (i.e.HIV) and, particularly in EBV+ disease, to be associated with overexpression of the MYC gene in EBV+ cells. Overexpressed MYC protein is thought to drive the disease but the role of EPV in MYC gene overexpression as well as the development and/or progression of EBV+ PBL is not clear. The prognosis of patients with advanced stage PBL, which is a common presentation of the disease in patients with HIV/AIDS, is poor (media survival 6–7 months). However, PBL patients with early stages of the disease and/or EBV+ disease have a much better survival rate. Overall, patients with HIV+ PBL respond to CHOP or EPOCH chemotherapy regimens with early results for the EPOCH regimen achieving medium survival rates that extend beyond one year.

=== Epstein–Barr virus–associated plasma cell myeloma ===
Plasma cell myeloma (PCM, also termed multiple myeloma), is a common cancer in which malignant plasma cells infiltrate the bone marrow or form soft tissue masses termed plasmacytomas. Rarely, EBV may be associated with this disease, particularly in individuals with an Immunodeficiency (e.g. HIV/AIDS, history of organ transplantation) or chronic inflammation (e.g. rheumatoid arthritis). EBV positivity is more common in the plasmacytoma rather than bone marrow infiltration form of PCM. Tissues involved in EBV+ PCM typically show foci of EBV+ cells with the appearance of rapidly proliferating (e.g. high mitotic index) immature or poorly differentiated anaplastic plasma cells. The cells express products of EBV genes such as EBER which suggest that EBV is in a restricted latency II phase. Although derived from B cells, these cells express plasma cell rather than B cell markers. The role of EBV in the development and progression of EBV+ PCM is unknown. EBER-positive patients with the localized plasmacytoma form of PCM are more likely to progress to the infiltrative (i.e. systemic) form of PCM compared to individuals with EBV- disease. The disorder has been treated with surgical removal in cases with one or two isolated plasmacytoma masses, radiation to isolated plasmacytoma tumor masses, and systemic chemotherapy (e.g. a doxorubicin, dexamethasone, and thalidomide regimen). However, post-therapeutic recurrence of the disease is common.

== EBV+ NK/T cell lymphoproliferative diseases ==
While EBV preferentially infects B cells, it may also infect other lymphocyte types viz., CD4+ T cells (i.e. T helper cells), CD8+ cells (i.e. cytotoxic T cells), NK cells (i.e. natural killer cells). The mechanism by which EBV infects these other cell types is unknown but may be their direct movement from B cells that are infected with the virus.

=== Peripheral T-cell lymphomas ===
Peripheral T cell lymphomas (PTCL) are a group of NK-cell or T-cell malignancies that include extranodal NK/T cell lymphoma, nasal type, peripheral T cell lymphoma, not otherwise specified (PTL, NOS), angioimmunoblastic T-cell lymphoma (AITL), and anaplastic lymphoma kinase positive or negative anaplastic large-cell lymphoma (AKL+/− ALCL). AKL+/− ALCL is rarely if ever associated with EBV and therefore not considered here.

==== Extranodal NK/T cell lymphoma, nasal type ====
Extranodal NK/T cell lymphoma, nasal type (ENKTL), is a malignancy of NK or, less commonly, T cells that affects primarily Asians and the indigenous populations of Mexico, Central America, and South America. It is less common in Western countries of the northern hemisphere. The disease usually consists of malignant tumors in the nasal cavities, paranasal sinuses, palate, tonsils, nasopharynx, hypopharynx, and/or larynx or, in ~20% of cases, tumors in the skin, soft tissues, gastrointestinal tract, testes, and/or central nervous system. Affected individuals are usually middle aged and present with obvious tumors, hemoptysis, ulcerating skin nodules, obstructions in the upper airways, and/or obstructions/bleeding in the lower gastrointestinal tract, particularly the colon. Involvement of lymph nodes is uncommon and generally due to the tumors' spread from their primary sites. About 70% of ENLTL cases are diagnosed as having cancer stage I or II disease (tumors localized to a single site or region of the body ) with the remainder having disseminated stage III or IV disease. All stages of ENKTL involve destructive, ulcerating, and necrotic lesions. Histologically, these tumors are composed of small, medium-sized, or large malignant lymphoid cells often accompanied by a mixture of benign inflammatory cells. The malignant cells express markers characteristic of NK and/or T cells (e.g. CD2, CD56, CD38), granzyme B, perforin, TIA1, and, with respect to T cells which are commonly gamma delta T cells in type, T-cell receptor gamma and delta chains). In nearly all cases, the lymphoma cells are EBER+, show a latency II pattern of EBV infection, have several somatic gene mutations among a group of >35 mutations know to be recurrent in the disease, and overexpress other genes (e.g. P53, and/or PD-L1). The genes most often mutated are GAK (25.9% of cases), beta-catenin (22.9%), TP53 (22.7%), and ECSIT (19.3%). These genes regulate cell growth and survival. Other genes (e.g. JAK3, STAT3, and STAT5B ) that are mutated in far lower percentages of cases also regulate these potentially pro-malignant cell functions. However, the relationship of EBV infection to these gene changes and the relationship of these changes to the development of ENKTL are unclear.

The diagnosis of ENKTL depends upon finding EBV and granzyme B in the disease's lymphoid tumor cells. Treatment varies with grade. For cancer grade I and II localized diseases, the recommended treatment is radiation directed at the tumor lesions plus a chemotherapy regimen such as DeVIC (dexamethasone, etoposide, ifosfamide, and carboplatin). Reported overall long-term survival and progression-free survival rates in Japan for individuals treated with this regimen are 72% and 61%, respectively. For stage III and IV disease, a more aggressive treatment regimen is used, SMILE (dexamethasone, methotrexate, leucovorin, ifosamide, L-asparaginase, and etoposide treatment followed, in patients with ≥2 risk factors, by hematopoietic stem cell transplantation from unrelated donors). This regimen reportedly achieves complete response and five-year survival rates of 87% and 73%, respectively. Reported complete response and five-year survival rates for relapsed or refractory ENKTL treated with the SMILE regimen are 45% and 47%, respectively. PD-L1 (programmed death-ligand 1) functions to suppress the proliferation of antigen-specific T cells and promote the survival of inflammation-suppressing T cells; it is over-expressed in >80% of ENKTL cases. Preparations of the monoclonal antibody directed against PD-L1 have given encouraging results in small clinical trials on patients with relapsed/refractory ENKTL. For example, pembrolizumab achieved clinical response in 8 of 15 patients and nivolumab in 2 of 3 patients with recurrent/refractory ENKTL. Pembrolizumab is now included as a treatment option for recurrent/refractory ENKTL by the National Comprehensive Cancer Network.

==== Epstein–Barr virus–associated peripheral T cell lymphoma, not otherwise specified ====
Peripheral T cell lymphoma, not otherwise specified (PTCL, NOS), is an aggressive, heterogeneous group of T cell malignancies with features that do not fit the diagnostic criteria for other types of PTCL. About 30–40% of all PTCL cases are classified as PTCL, NOS. This lymphoma commonly occurs in men (median age ~60 years) who present with advanced stage III or IV disease (~70% of cases) characterized by T cell infiltrations that cause prevalent lymph node swelling often accompanied by evidence of bone marrow, liver, spleen, and/or skin involvement. These individuals usually have B symptoms (i.e. fever, night sweats, weight loss). Involved tissues exhibit mature-appearing T cells that express CD4. However, attempts to define diagnostic criteria for PTCL, NOS by histology and immunophenotyping have not translated into clinical practice. Gene expression profiling has proven more useful for diagnosing the disease: gene abnormalities commonly associated with PTLC, NOS include various fusion rearrangements of the VAV1 or TBX21 genes and fusion rearrangements of the ITK gene with the SYK, FER, or ERBB4 genes. Two distinct profiles of gene overexpression have emerged from these studies: the malignant cells may overexpress GATA3, MYC, mTOR, and β-catenin genes or, alternatively, the TBX21, interferon-γ, and NF-κB genes. Individuals whose malignant cells express the GATA3 gene group have a poorer overall five-year survival than those whose malignant cells express the TBX2 gene group. As defined by the expression of EBER, ~30% of PTCL, NOS cases exhibit malignant T cells that are infected with EBV; in these cases, the virus is in its latency II phase. However, few of these cases evidence strong EBER expression in the malignant T cells. More often, EBER expression in this disease is limited to the small and large benign B cells the populate the background of the disease's lesions. Thus, the relationship of EBV to the development and progression of PTCL, NOS is unclear.

There are no controlled studies on the treatment of this disease. Recommended treatments for advanced stage PTCL, NOS (regardless of EBV status) include intensive chemotherapy regimens, e.g. CHOP, as induction therapy possibly followed by autologous hematopoietic stem cell transplantation. These regimens have shown only limited results with five-year overall survival rates <50% for chemotherapy alone. These survival rates may be improved in patients able to withstand follow-up bone marrow transplantation. Newer drug approaches using Pralatrexate, Romidepsin, Brentuximab vedotin, Belinostat, Bendamustine, lenalidomide, and alisertib have shown activity against CTCL, NOS and are being further studied in randomized trials for use in treating refractory and relapsed as well as initial disease.

==== Angioimmunoblastic T cell lymphoma ====
Angioimmunoblastic T cell lymphoma (ATIL) is a systemic malignancy of mature follicular B helper T cells (T_{FH} cells). ATIL is often manifested soon after individuals ingest antibiotics or have an infection or allergic reaction. The disease presents with generalized swelling of lymph nodes, enlarged liver and spleen, skin lesions (typically a rash - less commonly urticarial, purpural, nodular, or as plaques), symptoms of bone marrow involvement, and B symptoms (fever, weight loss, and night sweats). Individuals may also present with arthralgias, arthritis, pleural effusions, ascites, lung lesions, and neurological and gastrointestinal disturbances. Laboratory blood tests commonly reveal serum indicators of immune-mediated hemolytic anemia; elevated eosinophils, gamma globulins and lactic dehydrogenase; high erythrocyte sedimentation rates; and return positive results for autoantibodies such as rheumatoid factor, anti-nuclear antibody, and anti-smooth muscle antibody. Several of these clinical and laboratory findings are suggestive of underlying immune system abnormalities within the affected individual. Involved tissues exhibit vascular proliferation, clustering of small lymphoid cells around venules in a background containing T_{FH} cells, and activated lymphocytes, follicular dendritic cells, epithelioid cells, plasma cells, and eosinophils. Although only the T_{FH} cells are malignant, the latter cells represent 5–30% of all cells in the disease's lesions; expressing T_{FH} cell marker proteins (e.g. CD3, CD4, CD10, programmed cell death protein 1 (PD-1)), B lymphocyte chemoattractants, and chemokine (C-X-C motif) ligand 13 (i.e. CXCL13) . Virtually all cases exhibit a scattering of EBV+ B cells, where the virus has likely entered into a restricted latency II phase, while other cell types in these lesions - including malignant T_{FH} cells - are EBV negative. The EBV+ B cells have numerous non-malignant crippling mutations, often proliferate excessively, and, in some cases, transform into EBV+ B cell lymphomas. EBV virus may be involved in the development and/or transformation of EBV+ B cells to lymphoma, however the role of the virus in this cell transformation, and of ATIL, is uncertain.

The diagnostic criteria for AITL depends chiefly upon T_{FH} cells expressing the appropriate markers (in particular, CXCL13); the presence of EBV+ cells is further supportive of ATIL diagnosis. In 30–83% of ATIL cases, malignant T_{FH} cells have mutations in their TET2, IDH2, and RHOA genes, whereas malignant cells in PTCL, NOS exhibit these mutations in 17%, 0%, and 0% of cases, respectively. TET2 is the most common genetic loci for mutations in AITL (48% to 83% of cases) and generally occur in advanced-stage disease - future research may support the addition of these mutations (particularly TET2) to the criteria for AITL diagnosis.

The prognosis for ATIL is historically poor; on an increasing scale of disease severity, 14% of AITL patients present with an International Prognostic Index (IPI) score of 0–1, 59% with a score of 2–3, and 28% with a score of 4–5. The five-year overall survival rate of patients receiving CHOP or CHOP-like chemotherapy, and with IPI scores of 0–1 and 4–5 are 56% and 25%, respectively. The addition of etoposide or proteasome inhibitor, bortezomib, to CHOP regimes has modestly increased overall and complete response rates, likewise, autologous hematopoietic stem cell transplantation has shown improved results of CHOP. Existing small studies have evidenced that patients with refractory or relapsed AITL show positive responses to pralatrexate, romidepsin, belinostat, brentuximab vedotin, lenalidomide, alisertib, and mogamulizumab; these drugs are currently being investigated for their utility in both refractory/relapsed and initially untreated AITL.

===== Follicular T cell lymphoma =====
Follicular T cell lymphoma (FTCL), previously considered a variant of peripheral T cell lymphomas, was reclassified by the World Health Organization (2016) as a type of lymphoma in the category of angioimmunoblastic T cell lymphoma (AITL) and other nodal T_{FH} cell lymphomas. This rare disorder is similar to AITL in that it is a lymph node-based malignancy or T_{FH} cells; it differs from AITL in that it may be diagnosed at an early, limited, and comparatively less aggressive stage and that its tissue lesions lack characteristic features of AITL, e.g. the do not show vascular proliferation. FTCL develops mostly in elderly individuals but has been reported in those as young as 27 years. Individuals commonly (~73% of cases) present with advanced stage III or IV disease characterized by lymphadenopathy involving neck, armpit, and/or groin areas (~86%); enlarged liver (~25%) and/or spleen (25%); and malignant cell infiltrations in the bone marrow (~25%) or, rarely, tonsils, salivary glands, and/or hard palate. B symptoms of fever, night sweats, and weight loss occur in <33% of cases. Laboratory abnormalities include a positive Coombs test with or without accompanying autoimmune hemolytic anemia (~50%) and elevated blood levels of lactic acid dehydrogenase (45%) and gamma globulins (19%). Two histologic patterns of pathology in involved lymphoid tissues are described, 1) a follicular lymphoma-like pattern in which malignant T_{FH} cells form nodules and 2) a progressive transformation of germinal centers-like pattern in which malignant T_{FH} cells from irregularly-shaped nodules surrounded by immunoglobulin D positive mantle cells (a type of B cell). Large B cell immunoblasts and occasional Reed-Sternberg cell-like B cells may also occupy these lesions. In 50–60% of FTCL, one or more of these B cell types, but not the malignant T_{FH} cells, are infected with EBV, apparently in a latency II stage. Diagnosis of FTCLL depends on clinical and laboratory findings, the pathology of the lesions, and identification in lymph nodes, skin, or other lesions of T_{FH} cells as defined by their expression of appropriate marker proteins (e.g. PD-1, ICOS, CXCL13, CXCR5, and TOX).

No controlled studies on the treatment of the disease have been reported. Stage I and II localized FTCL has been treated with surgery, X-ray therapy, PUVA therapy, topical steroids, chlormethine, and/or carmustine. More extensive stage III and IV disease has been treated with single chemotherapy drugs (e.g. methotrexate); multiple chemotherapy drug regimens (e.g. CHOP, R-CVP (i.e. rituximab, cytoxin, vincristine, prednisone); with Rituximab, bortezomib, thalidomide, interferon-alpha, interferon-gamma, bexarotene, gemcitabine; and with hematopoietic stem cell transplantation. Responses to these treatments were variable and often disappointing. Most recently, however, bendamustine combined with rituximab or rituximab combined with cyclophosphamide, doxorubicin, vincristine, and prednisone have achieved partial response rates of >90% even in patients with advanced stage disease. While complete remission rates are substantially lower than 90% and treated patients have inevitably relapsed, these regimens are recommended front-line treatments for symptomatic advanced stage follicular lymphoma.

=== Systemic Epstein–Barr virus-positive T cell lymphoma of childhood ===
Systemic EBV-positive T cell lymphoma of childhood (TCLC) is an extremely rare and aggressive T cell lymphoma that occurs almost exclusively in children, adolescents, and young adults. It occurs more frequently in Asians and Latin Americans. The disease develops as a complication or progression of either Epstein–Barr virus-positive infectious mononucleosis (EPV+ IM) or chronic active Epstein–Barr virus infection (CAEBV)., that is, as a worsening of the signs/symptoms some three weeks after the onset of an EBV+ IM-like disease or an any time during the course of CAEBV. It presents in these diseases as the onset of progressive enlargements of the liver and spleen, worsening liver dysfunction, new skin rashes, pancytopenia (i.e. falls in the blood levels of leukocytes, red blood cells, and platelets), hemophagocytosis (i.e. ingestion of blood cells by histiocytes) in bone marrow and spleen), a coagulopathy (poor blood clotting), sepsis, and/or one or multiple organ failures. Unlike the findings in IM, patients with TCLC show low or undetectable levels of circulating IgM antibody but detectable levels of IgG antibody directed against EBV capsular antigens. Involved tissues contain rapidly proliferating small or, less commonly, somewhat larger lymphoid cells. These cells are EBV+ cytotoxic T cells and express CD8, CD3, CD2, TAI1, and granzyme but not CD56. Rarely and mostly in the setting of CAEBV disease, these cells are CD4+ T cells or a mixture of CD4+ and CD8+ T cells. The disease is usually fatal within weeks of diagnosis. A few cases have responded to the HLH-2004 chemotherapy protocol (etoposide, dexamethasone, cyclosporine A or, in selected cases, corticosteroids and intrathecal methotrexate, which may or many not be followed by hematopoietic stem cell transplantation.

=== Epstein–Barr virus–associated aggressive NK cell leukemia ===
Epstein–Barr virus–associated aggressive NK cell leukemia (EBV+ ANKL) is a rare NK cell malignancy that occurs most often in Asians and young to middle-aged adults. It sometimes evolves directly from other NK cell proliferative disorders such as, particularly in younger individuals, chronic active EBV infection (CAEBV). A study conducted in China found that all or almost all patients presented with B symptoms (weight loss, fever, night sweats) and an enlarged liver and/or spleen but not lymph nodes. Laboratory studies revealed pancytopenia (i.e. reduced numbers of circulating white blood cells, platelets, and red blood cells) in almost all cases; small increases in the levels of circulating large granular lymphocytes shown or suspected of being malignant NK cells in 50% of cases; increased numbers of NK cells in the bone marrow in all cases; greatly increased blood levels of lactic acid dehydrogenase and β_{2} microglobulin in all cases; liver damage as defined by increased blood levels of enzymes, total bilirubin, and indirect total bilirubin plus increased blood clotting time in ≥30% of cases; and CT scans showing non-specific interstitial pneumonia in 90% of cases. All cases had EPV+ lymphocytes in bone marrow and tissue infiltrates; occasional cases had also has circulating EBV+ lymphocytes. In other studies, EBV+ NK cells have been reported in 85–100% of cases. Histological analysis of involved tissues generally reveals infiltrates of large granular EBV+ NK cells mixed with benign inflammatory cells that are often focused around small blood vessels; these findings are usually accompanied by tissue necrosis. The EBV+ NK cells express CD56 antigen and are malignant with EBV in its latency II phase. The NK cells expression relatively high levels of the LMP1 viral protein; this protein may activate the NF-κB cell signaling pathway and thereby stimulate EBV-infected cells to proliferate. These findings occur in ~84% of individuals with what is termed "classic ANKL". Some 16% of individuals present with "sub-acute ANKL". The latter individuals exhibit signs and symptoms resembling infectious mononucleosis that endures for 3–15 months and then takes the fulminant course characteristic of classic ANKL.

Classic and sub-acute ANKL rapidly progress to life-threatening hemophagocytosis, disseminated intravascular coagulation, liver failure, renal failure, respiratory failure, and/or multiple organ failures. Median survival times in studies that did not distinguish between classic and sub-acute disease were ~60 days. A study of Chinese patients reported medium survival times of 49 days for classic and 215 days for sub-acute ANKL. Treatments for ANKL have typically used intensive chemotherapy regimens, either CHOP plus L-asparaginase or, alternatively, SMILE (i.e. dexamethasone, methotrexate, leucovorin, ifosfamide, L-Asparaginase, and etoposide. However, results with these regimens have been poor with little improvement in survival times. More recently, addition of autologous autologous hematopoietic stem cell transplantation to these chemotherapy regimens has modestly improved medium survival times in both classic and sub-acute disease. Further studies to find more effective treatment regimens for ANKL are needed. One regimen under such consideration uses AspaMetDex (L-asparagenase, methotrexate, dexamethasone) for induction therapy and SMILE for consolidation therapy followed by autologous hematopoietic stem cell transplantation.

=== Intravascular NK/T-cell lymphomas ===
Two extremely rare types of the intravascular lymphomas, intravascular NK-cell lymphoma and intravascular T- cell lymphoma, are associated with, and appear driven by, EBV infection of NK- and cytotoxic T-cells, respectively. At presentation, affected individuals (age range 23–81 years) exhibit skin lesions; less commonly, signs and symptoms of central nervous system involvement; and, in a minority of cases, signs and symptoms of bone marrow, liver, kidneys, ovaries, and/or cervix involvement. At that time or shortly thereafter, they show clear signs of having a disseminated disease such as fever, weight loss, night sweats, arthralgias, jaundice, decreased numbers of circulating red blood cells, white blood cells, and/or platelets, and the involvement of multiple organs. The two intravascular lymphomas are, in general, aggressive and rapidly progressive diseases with patients usually responding poorly to treatment and having short (often less than 12 months) survival times.

== EBV-associated immunodeficiency-related lymphoproliferative disorders ==
EBV infection is associated with various lymphoproliferative disorders that have a high frequency of occurring in individuals with any one of several different types of immunodeficiency. This category of EBV+ LPD is heterogeneous, involving EBV-infected B cells, T cells, and/or histiocytic/dendritic cells. These LPD also occur in immunocompetent individuals and are detailed in the above section entitled "EBV+ B cell lymphoproliferative diseases".

=== EBV-related and HIV-related LPD ===
Individuals carrying the human immunodeficiency virus (HIV, the cause of AIDS) have an increased incidence of developing a LPD ranging from polyclonal lymphocyte proliferation (i.e. the abnormal proliferation of two or more clones of benign lymphocytes) to overtly malignant LPD. The EBV-related and HIV-related malignant LPD are: diffuse large B cell lymphomas with plasmablastic features (DLBL); a distinctive subtype of DLBL termed primary central nervous system lymphoma (PCNSL); Burkitt lymphoma (BL); Hodgkin lymphoma (HL); plasmablastic lymphoma (PBL); and primary effusion lymphoma (PEL) (also termed pleural effusion lymphoma). (PEL cases are infected not only with HIV and in most cases EBV but also Kaposi's sarcoma-associated herpesvirus (HHV8) in all cases.) These LPD are B cell diseases which the World Health Organization (2016) divides into those occurring in: 1) immune-competent, HIV-negative individuals; 2) HIV+ individuals; and 3) individuals with other immunodeficiency disorders. The LPD occurring in immune-competent, HIV-negative individuals are detailed in the above section entitled EBV+ B cell lymphoproliferative diseases. The LPD occurring predominantly in HIV-positive individuals are detailed in the following Table which gives the percentage of the LPD that are EBV+, the latency phase of the virus in each LPD, and some factors expressed by the hosts malignant cells which promote the development, growth, and/or survival of the malignant cells in each LPD.

LPD type	Percent EBV+	Latency phase	Latent EBV genes expressed	Factors promoting the development, growth and/or survival of malignant cells
DLBL	30–40%	III	all	Mutations or changes in the expression of TNFAIP3, MYC, and/or BCL6 genes.
PCNSL	90–100%	III	all	Mutations in MYD88 and CD79B genes and copy number gains at the programmed death ligand 1 and programmed death ligand 2 gene loci on chromosome 9.
BL	30–40%	I	EBERs	Translocations and/or mutations in the MYC and/or TP53 genes.
HL	100%	II	LMP1, LMP2, LMP2A, EBNA1, EBERs	The products proteins of some of these viral genes stimulate the NFkB cell signaling pathway.
PBL	70–80%	possible I/II	EBERs, rarely LMP1	Translocations, amplifications, and other causes (e.g. mutations in the PRDM1 gene) lead to the overexpression of the MYC gene.
PEL	90%	possible I/II	EBNA1, LMP2A, EBERs	Concurrent infection with HHV8 and this virus's expression of its transforming proteins (e.g. LANA1) appears responsible for the disorder.

Further findings and the treatment of EBV-related and HIV-related LPD are given in the "EBV+ B cell lymphoproliferative diseases" section. Except for the possible exclusion of PEL, these treatments should include continuance or, in individuals who have not yet been treated for AIDS, the institution of anti-HIV combination drug regimens. In the category of EBV+ LPD occurring in individuals who are immunodeficient due to other causes than HIV infection, the other causes for immune-incompetency include:

1) Immune deficiency diseases such as common variable immunodeficiency, X-linked agammaglobulinemia, hypogammaglobulinemia, the Wiskott–Aldrich syndrome, ataxia telangiectasia, the radiosensitive forms of severe combined immunodeficiency disease (SCID), the autoimmune lymphoproliferative syndrome, and the WHIM syndrome.

2) Immunosuppressive drug therapy, particularly methotrexate and regimens including methotrexate.

3) Genetic defects in the expression of genes for XIAP encoding the X-linked inhibitor of apoptosis protein, IAK encoding interleukin-2 inducible T cell kinase, CD27 encoding a receptor in the tumor necrosis factor receptor superfamily, STK4 encoding serine/threonine-protein kinase 4, 1CTPS1 encoding CTP sythetase, CORO1A encoding coronin 1A, APDS encoding activated phosphatidylinositide 3-kinase, CD16 encoding FcγRIII, GATA2 encoding GATA-binding factor 2 (a transcription factor), and MCM4 encoding the DNA replication licensing factor, MCM4.

4) Inflammatory/autoimmune diseases such as chronic hepatitis, ulcerative colitis, retroperitoneal fibrosis, and primary biliary cholangitis.

5) Chronic autoimmune and inflammatory diseases such as rheumatoid arthritis, Graves' disease, Giant-cell arteritis, sarcoidosis, and severe psoriasis), particularly in individuals receiving immunosuppressive drugs for these diseases.

Treatment of these diseases generally follows that for the LPD occurring in immune-competent individuals but include discontinuing or reducing the dosages of immunosuppressive drugs and addressing the underlying disease causing immunodeficiency.

=== Post-transplant lymphoproliferative disorders ===
Post-transplant lymphoproliferative disorders (PTLD) are a group of LPD that occur following solid organ or hematopoietic stem cell transplantation. It is due to the immunosuppressive drug regimens that accompany these transplantations. EBV-positivity occurs in 60–80% of these cases and, unlike EBV-negative cases, EBV+ cases develop more often within the first year after transplantation. The 2026 WHO classification divides these disorders into:

1) Non-destructive PTLD: this disorder is characterized by hyperplasia of plasma cells, florid hyperplasia of lymph node follicles, and infectious mononucleosis. All three of these are non-malignant disorders that involve lesions admixed with non-destructive proliferations of plasma which are usually EBV-negative, EBV-negative B cells, and rare EBV-positive T cells.

2) Monomorphic PTLD: this disorder is a B- or T cell lymphoma. It includes only aggressive lymphomas while excluding all indolent forms of LPD except for the inclusion of EBV-positive mucocutaneous ulcer The EBV+ positivity of cells involved in these PTLD are similar to those occurring in immune-competent individuals. In EBV-positive mucocutaneous ulcer, lesions commonly include EBV-positive plasma cells.

3) Classic Hodgkin lymphoma: This HD malignancy is characterized by have EBV+ cells its lesions. These lesions are otherwise similar to those occurring in immune competent individuals.

The virus in the three PTLD are in latency phase III and express most if not all of their latency genes including, in particular, LMP1 and LMP2A. The latter two EBV latency proteins are thought to promote the development and progression these PTLD by activating the NFkB pathway in and thereby stimulating the proliferation and survival of the infected host cells.

== EBV-associated histiocytic-dendritic disorders ==
=== Inflammatory pseudotumor-like follicular/fibroblastic dendritic cell sarcoma ===
Inflammatory pseudotumor-like follicular/fibroblastic dendritic cell sarcoma is a variant of follicular dendritic cell sarcoma (FDCS). FDCS is a rare malignancy of follicular dendritic cells (FD cells). These myofibroblast-like cells are derived from the stroma (i.e. connective tissue) of lymph nodes and other lymphatic tissue and therefore are not lymphocytes. FD cells express several markers expressed by lymphocytes; occupy the germinal centers of lymphoid tissues; and attract, stimulate the differentiation and proliferation of, and present foreign antigens to B-cells. The FD cells in FDCS may derive from follicular lymphoma cells by the process of transdifferentiation. FDCS affects primarily young to middle-aged adults of both sexes. Affected individuals commonly present with painless, slowly progressive swelling of cervical lymph nodes. About 33% of cases exhibit (with or without cervical lymph node swelling) tumors of skin, mediastinum, tonsils, gastrointestinal tract, and/or soft tissues. Some 10–20% of all cases are associated with precedent or contemporary Castleman disease, a benign lymphoproliferative disorder. There are two histopathological forms of FDCS, conventional and inflammatory. Conventional FDCS exhibits spindle-shaped FD cells in a background of small lymphocytes; inflammatory FDCS exhibits relatively rare spindle-shaped cells in a background of plasma cells, middle- to large-sized lymphocytes, and Reed–Sternberg-like cells. EBV is associated only with the inflammatory form of FDCS. In these cases, the FD cells express FD-cell markers (e.g. CD21, CD23, CD35, clusterin, podoplanin, gamma-synuclein) and in >90% of cases products of the virus's EBER and LMLP1 genes. These cells are infected with EBV in latency II or III phases while the background cells are EBV-negative and not malignant. In one study, two of five individuals with EBV+ FDCS had an activating mutation in BRAF. While a role for EBV in FDCS remains unproven, LMP1 is able to transform rat fibroblasts into malignant-like behavior in vitro. The expression of LMP1 by FD cells might contribute to the malignancy of these cells in FDCS.

Overall, patients with FDCS have local recurrence rates of 40–50 and a long term mortality rates due to the disease of ~20%. However, FDSC, particularly in cases with only lymph node involvement, usually has an indolent course with a low rate (~10%) of metastasis. In these cases, surgical removal appears to be the treatment of choice; the role of radiation and chemotherapy here is not well-defined. Cases with extranodal involvement, especially those with abdominal tumors, have a higher metastatic rate (~20%). Chemotherapy regimens remain the mainstay for treating disseminated FDCS. However, these regimens (e.g. CHOP, ICE, and ABVD) have produced variable results. Too few individuals have been treated with allogeneic hematopoietic stem cell transplantation to determine its role in treating FDSC. Further studies on the usefulness of radiation, chemotherapy, bone marrow transplantation, and newer non-chemotherapy drugs such as the BRAF oncogene inhibitor, vemurafenib, (for individuals with the BRAF oncogene), are needed.

== Treatment ==
Tabelecleucel (trade name Ebvallo) was granted marketing authorization under ‘exceptional circumstances’ on 16 December 2022 as monotherapy for the treatment of patients who are: at least 2 years of age; had received a hematopoietic stem cell transplantation; and then developed an EBV+ LPD which was either refractory to or relapsed after receiving at least one therapy for their EBV+ LPD.
