= Epstein–Barr virus infection =

- Other names: Immunodeficiency 32B
- Specialty: Infectious diseases

There are several forms of Epstein–Barr virus (EBV) infection. These include asymptomatic infections, the primary infection, infectious mononucleosis, and the progression of asymptomatic or primary infections to: 1) any one of various Epstein–Barr virus-associated lymphoproliferative diseases such as chronic active EBV infection, EBV+ hemophagocytic lymphohistiocytosis, Burkitt's lymphoma, and Epstein–Barr virus positive diffuse large B-cell lymphoma, not otherwise specified); 2) non-lymphoid cancers such as Epstein–Barr virus associated gastric cancer, soft tissue sarcomas, leiomyosarcoma, and nasopharyngeal cancers; and 3) Epstein–Barr virus-associated non-lymphoproliferative diseases such as some cases of the immune disorders of multiple sclerosis and systemic lupus erythematosus and the childhood disorders of Alice in Wonderland syndrome and acute cerebellar ataxia.

== Signs and symptoms ==
Signs and symptoms of infectious mononucleosis are fever, sore throat, and swollen lymph glands. Sometimes, a swollen spleen or liver involvement may develop. Heart problems or involvement of the central nervous system occur only rarely, and infectious mononucleosis is rarely fatal. There are no known associations between active EBV infection and problems during pregnancy, such as miscarriages or birth defects. Although the symptoms of infectious mononucleosis usually resolve in 1 or 2 months, EBV remains dormant or latent in a few cells in the throat and blood for the rest of the person's life. Periodically, the virus can reactivate and is commonly found in the saliva of infected persons. Reactivated and post-latent virus may pass the placental barrier in (also seropositive) pregnant women via macrophages and therefore can infect the fetus. Also, re-infection of prior seropositive individuals may occur. In contrast, reactivation in adults usually occurs without symptoms of illness.

EBV also establishes a lifelong dormant infection in some cells of the body's immune system. A late event in a very few carriers of this virus is the emergence of Burkitt's lymphoma and nasopharyngeal carcinoma, two rare cancers. EBV appears to play an important role in these malignancies, but is probably not the sole cause of disease.

Most individuals exposed to people with infectious mononucleosis have previously been infected with EBV and are not at risk for infectious mononucleosis. In addition, transmission of EBV requires intimate contact with the saliva (found in the mouth) of an infected person. Transmission of this virus through the air or blood does not normally occur. The incubation period, or the time from infection to appearance of symptoms, ranges from 2 to 6 weeks, with 4 weeks being the most common. Persons with infectious mononucleosis may be able to spread the infection to others for a period of weeks. However, no special precautions or isolation procedures are recommended, since the virus is also found frequently in the saliva of healthy people. In fact, many healthy people can carry and spread the virus intermittently for life. These people are usually the primary reservoir for person-to-person transmission. For this reason, transmission of the virus is almost impossible to prevent.

The clinical diagnosis of infectious mononucleosis is suggested on the basis of the symptoms of fever, sore throat, swollen lymph glands, and the age of the patient. Usually, laboratory tests are needed for confirmation. Blood test results for persons with infectious mononucleosis include an elevated white blood cell count and an increased percentage of atypical mononuclear cells. Liver enzymes are often elevated. A positive "mono spot" test is useful in confirming the diagnosis, but a negative result does not rule out primary EBV infection.

=== EBV-associated diseases ===
- Chronic active EBV infection
- Epstein–Barr virus-associated lymphoproliferative diseases
- Hodgkin's disease
- Acute kidney injury
- Alice in Wonderland syndrome
- Common variable immunodeficiency (CVID)
- Hairy leukoplakia
- Hepatitis
- Herpangina
- Infectious mononucleosis
- Kikuchi's disease
- Multiple sclerosis (higher risk in patients infected as teenagers than as children)
- Nasopharyngeal cancer
- Several Non-Hodgkin's lymphomas, including Burkitt's lymphoma and primary cerebral lymphoma
- Post-transplant lymphoproliferative disorder
- Smooth muscle tumors
- Stevens–Johnson syndrome
- Subepithelial Infiltrates
- New daily persistent headache (NDPH)

== Pathology ==
=== Infectious mononucleosis ===
Epstein–Barr can cause infectious mononucleosis, also known as 'glandular fever', 'mono', and 'Pfeiffer's disease'. Infectious mononucleosis is caused when a person is first exposed to the virus during or after adolescence. It is predominantly found in the developing world, and most children in the developing world are found to have already been infected by around 18 months of age. Infection of children can occur when adults mouth-feed or pre-chew food before giving it to the child. EBV antibody tests turn up almost universally positive. In the United States roughly half of five-year-olds have been infected.

=== EBV-associated malignancies ===
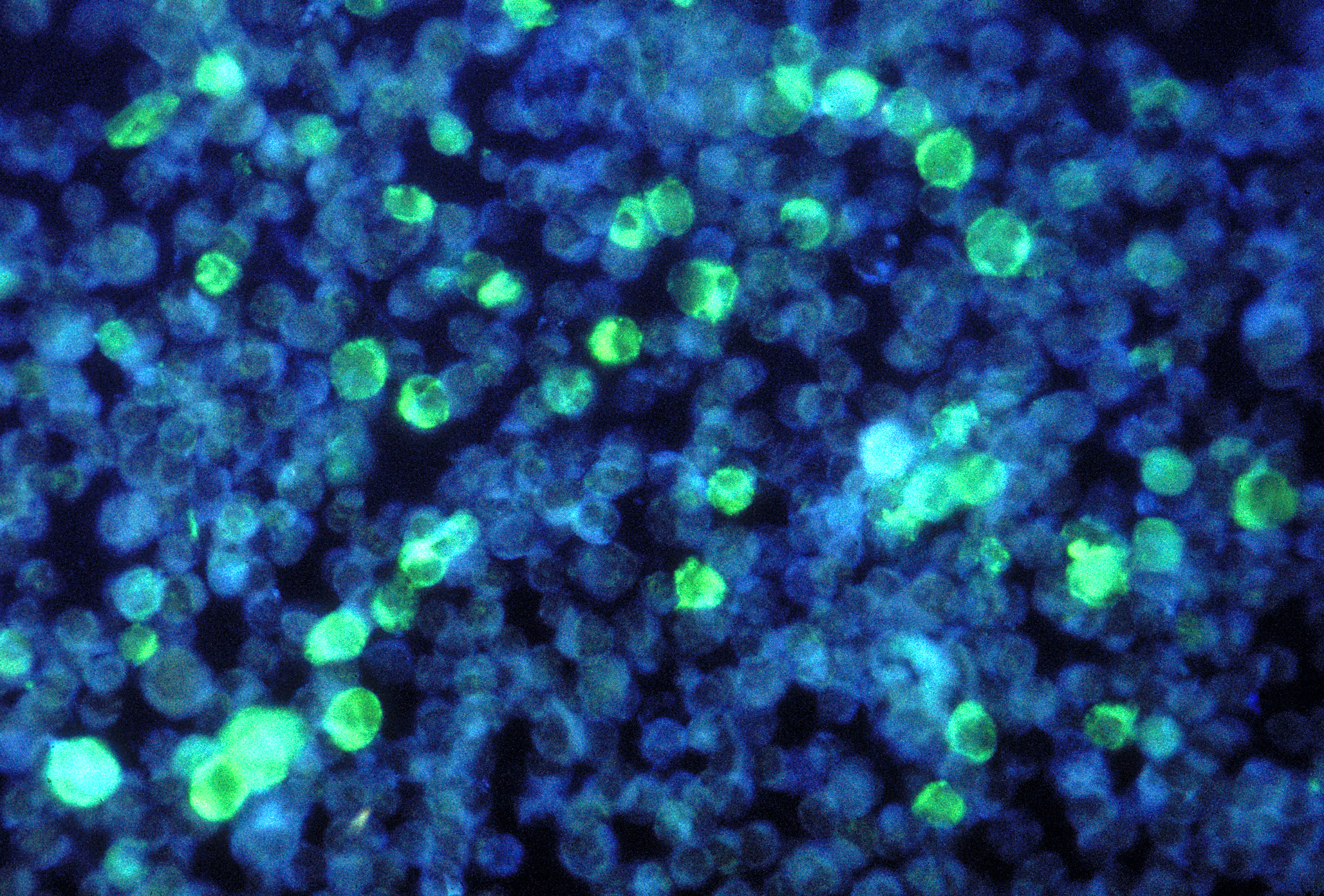
This photomicrograph depicts leukemia cells that contain Epstein–Barr virus using a FA staining technique. Epstein–Barr virus, EBV, is a member of the Herpesvirus family, and is one of the most common human viruses. When infection with EBV occurs during adolescence or young adulthood, it causes infectious mononucleosis 35% to 50% of the time. (CDC)

The strongest evidence linking EBV and cancer formation is found in Burkitt's lymphoma and nasopharyngeal carcinoma. Additionally, it has been postulated to be a trigger for a subset of chronic fatigue syndrome patients as well as multiple sclerosis and other autoimmune diseases.

Burkitt's lymphoma is a type of Non-Hodgkin's lymphoma and is most common in equatorial Africa and is co-existent with the presence of malaria. Malaria infection causes reduced immune surveillance of B cells immortalized by EBV, resulting in an excessive number of B cells and an increased likelihood of an unchecked mutation. Repeated mutations can lead to loss of cell-cycle control, causing excessive proliferation observed as Burkitt's lymphoma. Burkitt's lymphoma commonly affects the jaw bone, forming a huge tumor mass. It responds quickly to chemotherapy treatment, namely cyclophosphamide, but recurrence is common.

Other B-cell lymphomas arise in immunocompromised patients, such as those with AIDS or who have undergone organ transplantation with associated immunosuppression (Post-Transplant Lymphoproliferative Disorder (PTLPD)). Smooth muscle tumors are also associated with the virus in malignant patients.

Nasopharyngeal carcinoma is a cancer found in the upper respiratory tract, most commonly in the nasopharynx, and is linked to the EBV virus. It is found predominantly in Southern China and Africa, due to both genetic and environmental factors. It is much more common in people of Chinese ancestry (genetic), but is also linked to the Chinese diet of a high amount of smoked fish, which contain nitrosamines, well known carcinogens (environmental).

== Diagnosis ==
EBV can be diagnosed through a serological test which detects antibodies in the blood. A serological test should not be conducted among patients with antibody deficiencies and/or passive antibodies. Another test involves screening for the measurement of EBV viral loads in peripheral blood. Radiographic testing is often paired with EBV viral load measuring. A biopsy can also be conducted to find where the EBV is manifested.

== Treatment ==
There is no specific treatment for infectious mononucleosis, other than treating the symptoms. In severe cases, steroids such as corticosteroids may be used to control the swelling of the throat and tonsils. Currently, there are no antiviral drugs or vaccines available.

Symptoms related to infectious mononucleosis caused by EBV infection seldom last for more than four months. When such an illness lasts more than six months, it is frequently called chronic EBV infection. However, valid laboratory evidence for continued active EBV infection is seldom found in these patients. The illness should be investigated further to determine if it meets the criteria for chronic fatigue syndrome, or CFS. This process includes ruling out other causes of chronic illness or fatigue.

== See also ==
- Virus latency
- Herpesviridae
- BK virus
- Low-dose naltrexone
