= Chronic active EBV infection =

- Other names: CAEBV
- Symptoms: Fever, hepatitis, spleen enlargement
- Causes: Epstein–Barr virus infection
- Treatment: Allogeneic haematopoietic stem cell transplant

Chronic active Epstein–Barr virus infection is a very rare and often fatal chronic illness in which the body fails to control an Epstein–Barr virus (EBV) infection at least six months after initial infection. Chronic active EBV infection most often occurs in children or adolescents of Asian or South American lineage, although cases in Hispanics, Europeans and Africans have been reported. It is classified as one of the Epstein-Barr virus-associated lymphoproliferative diseases (i.e. EBV+ LPD).

== Presentation ==
The most common symptoms of CAEBV include:

- Fatigue
- Fever
- Hepatitis
- Pancytopenia
- Spleen enlargement
- Hypersensitivity to mosquito bites

Complications include:

- Interstitial pneumonia
- Lymphoma, including B-cell, T-cell and NK-cell lymphomas
- Haemophagocytic syndrome
- Coronary artery aneurysms
- Liver failure
- Nasopharyngeal carcinoma
- Gastric adenocarcinoma
- Intestinal perforation
- Myocarditis
- Peripheral neuropathy

== Pathophysiology ==
It arises from the cells that constitute the immune system, most often the T-cells and NK cells in Asians/South Americans and the B-cells in the other racial groups. Various cytokine anomalies have been reported in people with CAEBV, examples include:

- IL-1β ↑ (elevated)
- IL-4 ↑
- IL-6 ↑
- IL-10 ↑
- IL-12 ↑
- IL-13 ↑
- IL-15 ↑
- TNF ↑
- IFN-γ ↑

There is also evidence supporting a role for TGF-β in the disease. Those that develop the haemophagocytic syndrome often exhibit an abnormally high amount of IL-1β and IFN-γ.

== Treatment ==
The only known cure for CAEBV is allogeneic haematopoietic stem cell transplant (HSCT), with all other treatment options (rituximab, cytotoxic chemotherapy and immunosuppressive therapy) being nothing more than stopgaps.

== Prognosis ==
Without HSCT the condition is inevitably fatal and even HSCT is no guarantee, with a significant portion of patients dying from the disease progression. Factors indicative of a poor prognosis include: thrombocytopenia, late onset of the disease (age ≥ 8 years) and T cell involvement.
