= Angioimmunoblastic T-cell lymphoma =

- Other names: immunoblastic lymphadenopathy (Lukes-Collins Classification), AILD-type (lymphogranulomatosis X) T-cell lymphoma (Kiel Classification)
- Specialty: Hematology and oncology
- Frequency: 0.0001%

Angioimmunoblastic T-cell lymphoma (AITL, sometimes misspelled AILT, formerly known as "angioimmunoblastic lymphadenopathy with dysproteinemia") is a mature T-cell lymphoma of blood or lymph vessel immunoblasts characterized by a polymorphous lymph node infiltrate showing a marked increase in follicular dendritic cells (FDCs) and high endothelial venules (HEVs) and systemic involvement.

== Signs and symptoms ==
Patients with AITL usually present at an advanced stage and show systemic involvement. The clinical findings typically include a pruritic skin rash and possibly edema, ascites, pleural effusions, and arthritis.

== Causes ==
AITL was originally thought to be a premalignant condition, termed angioimmunoblastic lymphadenopathy, and this atypical reactive lymphadenopathy carried a risk for transformation into a lymphoma. It is postulated that the originating cell for AITL is a mature (post-thymic) CD4+ T-cell that arises de novo, or that the disease has a premalignant subtype. The Epstein–Barr virus (EBV) is observed in the majority of cases, being identified in the reactive (i.e. non-malignant) B-cells that comprise part of the polymorphous infiltrate of AITL. These EBV+ B cells have numerous non-malignant crippling mutations, often proliferate excessively, and in some cases may transform into EBV+ B cell lymphomas. The other cell types in these infiltrates, including the malignant T_{FH} cells, are EBV negative. While the World Health Organization (2016) has classified these EBV-associated cases as one of the Epstein–Barr virus-associated lymphoproliferative diseases (see EBV+ angioimmunoblastic T cell lymphoma, the role of the virus in the development and progression of EBV+ angioimmunoblastic T cell lymphoma is unclear. Immunodeficiency is also seen with AITL, but it is a sequela and not a predisposing factor.

== Diagnosis ==
=== Laboratory findings ===
The classical laboratory finding is polyclonal hypergammaglobulinemia, and other immunoglobulin derangements are also seen, including hemolytic anemia with cold agglutinins, circulating immune complexes, anti-smooth muscle antibodies, and positive rheumatoid factor.

=== Lymph node ===
The normal architecture of a lymph node is partially effaced by a polymorphous infiltrate and residual follicles are commonly seen. The polymorphous infiltrate consists of lymphocytes of moderate size with pale/clear cytoplasm and smaller reactive lymphocytes, eosinophils, histiocytes, plasma cells, and follicular dendritic cells. In addition, blast-like B-cells are occasionally seen. A classic morphological finding is the arborization and proliferation of high endothelial venules. Hyperplastic germinal centers and Reed-Sternberg-like cells can also be seen.

=== Immunophenotype ===
AITL typically has the phenotype of a mixture of CD4+ and CD8+ T-cells, with a CD4:CD8 ratio greater than unity. Polyclonal plasma cells and CD21+ follicular dendritic cells are also seen.

=== Molecular findings ===
Clonal T-cell receptor gene rearrangements are detected in 75% of cases, and immunoglobin gene rearrangements are seen in 10% of cases, and these cases are believed to be due to expanded EBV-driven B-cell populations. Similarly, EBV-related sequences can be detected in most cases, usually in B-cells but occasionally in T-cells. Trisomy 3, trisomy 5, and +X are the most frequent chromosomal abnormalities found in AITL cases.

== Treatment ==
There is a subset of AITL that can remit with immunosuppression with agents like glucocorticoids or methotrexate. Most patients, however, will need combination chemotherapy like CHOP-like chemotherapy backbone- either CHOP alone or CHOP in combination with etoposide (CHOEP). Median response duration is short and median OS is only 15–36 months. Relapsed disease is treated similar to the relapsed PTCL, NOS.[17]

== Epidemiology ==
The typical patient with angioimmunoblastic T-cell lymphoma (AITL) is either middle-aged or elderly, and no gender preference for this disease has been observed. AITL comprises 15–20% of peripheral T-cell lymphomas and 1–2% of all non-Hodgkin lymphomas.

== See also ==
- Immunoblast
- List of hematologic conditions
- Rosai–Dorfman disease
