= Tabelecleucel =

Immunotherapy

Clinical data
- Trade names: Ebvallo
- Other names: ATA129
- Routes of administration: Intravenous
- ATC code: L01XL09 (WHO)

Legal status
- Legal status: EU: Rx-only

Identifiers
- DrugBank: DB17072
- UNII: G3NJ7M8N4H
- KEGG: D11146

Tabelecleucel, sold under the brand name Ebvallo, is a medication used for the treatment of Epstein-Barr virus positive post-transplant lymphoproliferative disease (EBV+ PTLD). Tabelecleucel is an allogeneic, EBV-specific T-cell immunotherapy which targets and eliminates EBV-infected cells in a human leukocyte antigen (HLA)-restricted manner. It is made of cells of the immune system called T-cells that have been taken from a donor (allogeneic) and are then mixed with EBV-infected B-cells from the same donor.

The most common side effects include fever, diarrhea, fatigue, nausea (feeling sick), anemia (low red blood cell count), reduced appetite, hyponatremia (low sodium levels in the blood), abdominal pain, low white blood cell count, including neutrophils (white blood cells that fight infections), elevated blood levels of aspartate aminotransferase, alanine aminotransferase, and alkaline phosphatase (indicators of potential liver damage), constipation, hypoxia (low blood oxygen levels), dehydration, hypotension (low blood pressure), nasal congestion, and rash.

Tabelecleucel was approved for medical use in the European Union in December 2022.

== Medical uses ==
Tabelecleucel is indicated as monotherapy for treatment of people aged two years of age and older with relapsed or refractory Epstein-Barr virus positive post-transplant lymphoproliferative disease (EBV+ PTLD) who have received at least one prior therapy.

=== Post-transplant lymphoproliferative disorder ===
People who have undergone organ transplantation are routinely treated with immunosuppressive drugs to prevent transplant rejection. As a result of the treatment, some people develop Epstein-Barr virus (EBV) associated post-transplant lymphoproliferative disorder (PTLD) in which white blood cells become infected with EBV and which in turn triggers excessive division of those cells. PTLD is initially non-cancerous, but can progress to cancerous Hodgkin lymphoma. First-line treatments of PTLD include monoclonal antibodies such as rituximab and chemotherapy if cancer has developed.

== Adverse effects ==
The most common side effects are fever, diarrhea, tiredness, feeling sick, low levels of red blood cells, decreased appetite and low blood sodium levels.

== History ==
The EMA recommendation is based on the results of an ongoing multicenter, phase III, single-arm, open-label clinical trial. The study investigated the efficacy and safety of tabelecleucel in 43 participants with relapsed/refractory EBV+ PTLD who had received at least one prior therapy.

== Society and culture ==
=== Legal status ===
On 13 October 2022, the Committee for Medicinal Products for Human Use (CHMP) of the European Medicines Agency (EMA) adopted a positive opinion, recommending the granting of a marketing authorization under exceptional circumstances for the medicinal product Ebvallo, intended for the treatment of Epstein-Barr virus positive post-transplant lymphoproliferative disease (EBV+ PTLD). As Ebvallo is an advanced therapy medicinal product, the CHMP positive opinion is based on an assessment by the Committee for Advanced Therapies. The applicant for this medicinal product is Atara Biotherapeutics Ireland Limited. Tabelecleucel was approved for medical use in the European Union in December 2022.
