= Alisertib =

Selective aurora A kinase inhibitor

Names
- Preferred IUPAC name 4-{[9-Chloro-7-(2-fluoro-6-methoxyphenyl)-5H-pyrimido[5,4-d][2]benzazepin-2-yl]amino}-2-methoxybenzoic acid

Identifiers
CAS Number	1028486-01-2
3D model (JSmol)	Interactive image
ChEBI	CHEBI:125628
ChEMBL	ChEMBL483158
ChemSpider	24700147
IUPHAR/BPS	7790
KEGG	D10085
PubChem CID	24771867
UNII	T66ES73M18
CompTox Dashboard (EPA)	DTXSID30145539
- InChI: InChI=1S/C27H20ClFN4O4/c1-36-21-5-3-4-20(29)23(21)25-19-10-15(28)6-8-17(19)24-14(12-30-25)13-31-27(33-24)32-16-7-9-18(26(34)35)22(11-16)37-2/h3-11,13H,12H2,1-2H3,(H,34,35)(H,31,32,33) Key: ZLHFILGSQDJULK-UHFFFAOYSA-N; InChI=1/C27H20ClFN4O4/c1-36-21-5-3-4-20(29)23(21)25-19-10-15(28)6-8-17(19)24-14(12-30-25)13-31-27(33-24)32-16-7-9-18(26(34)35)22(11-16)37-2/h3-11,13H,12H2,1-2H3,(H,34,35)(H,31,32,33) Key: ZLHFILGSQDJULK-UHFFFAOYAB
- SMILES: COC1=C(C(=CC=C1)F)C2=NCC3=CN=C(N=C3C4=C2C=C(C=C4)Cl)NC5=CC(=C(C=C5)C(=O)O)OC

Properties
Chemical formula	C_{27}H_{20}ClFN_{4}O_{4}
Molar mass	518.93 g·mol^{−1}
- Except where otherwise noted, data are given for materials in their standard state (at 25 °C [77 °F], 100 kPa). Infobox references

Alisertib (MLN8237) is an orally available, investigational, reversible, ATP-competitive, selective aurora A kinase inhibitor developed by Takeda. Inhibition of aurora A kinase A leads to disruption of mitotic spindle apparatus assembly, disruption of chromosome segregation, and inhibition of cell proliferation.

Takeda investigated alisertib as a treatment for relapsed or refractory peripheral T-cell lymphoma and development was paused in 2015 until Puma Biotechnology licensed global rights to alisertib from Takeda in 2022.

In clinical trials to date, alisertib has shown single agent activity and activity in combination with other cancer drugs in the treatment of many different types of cancers, including hormone receptor positive breast cancer, triple negative breast cancer, small cell lung cancer and head and neck cancer.
