= Epstein–Barr virus positive diffuse large B-cell lymphoma =

Human medical condition

Epstein–Barr virus-positive diffuse large B-cell lymphoma
- Other names: EBV+ DLBCL, NOS
- Specialty: Hematology, oncology
- Symptoms: B symptoms
- Causes: Epstein-Barr virus infection
- Risk factors: Old age; immunosuppression
- Diagnostic method: Histology of involved tissue
- Treatment: Chemotherapy (R-CHOP)
- Medication: Rituximab, cyclophosphamide, doxorubicin, vincristine, prednisone, etoposide, prednisolone
- Prognosis: >50 years: 5-year survival 25%; ≤50 years: similar to EBV- DLBCL
- Frequency: 5-15% of DLBCL cases

Epstein–Barr virus-positive diffuse large B-cell lymphoma, not otherwise specified (EBV+ DLBCL, NOS) is a form of diffuse large B-cell lymphomas (DLBCL) accounting for around 10-15% of DLBCL cases. DLBCL are lymphomas in which B-cell lymphocytes proliferate excessively, invade multiple tissues, and often cause life-threatening tissue damage. EBV+ DLBCL is distinguished from DLBCL in that, in virtually all the large B cells in the tissue, infiltrates of the Epstein–Barr virus (EBV) express EBV genes characteristic of the virus's latency III (common in the elderly) or II (common in younger patients) phase. EBV is a ubiquitous virus, infecting around 95% of the world population.

EBV+ DLBCL, NOS was previously named Epstein–Barr virus-positive DLBCL of the elderly, by the World Health Organization (WHO) in 2008; because it appeared to be limited to people over the age of 50. The name was changed to EBV+ DLBCL, NOS by the WHO in 2016, after the disease was described in much younger adults and children. The disease is also classified as one of numerous related and interrelated Epstein-Barr virus-associated lymphoproliferative diseases. EBV+ DLBCL, NOS is usually CD20 positive, and has clonal immunoglobulin gene rearrangement.

== Biology ==
Although reported almost exclusively in Asians, it is not confined to that population. The disease usually has an extranodal presentation, with or without lymph node involvement.

Morphologically, areas of necrosis are often seen as well as Reed–Sternberg-like cells. There are two subtypes: one with monotonous large cells, the other with numerous cell sizes as well as reactive cells, but different clinical behavior is not appreciated between these subtypes. Morphological differential diagnosis is Hodgkin lymphoma. Median survival is 2 years in the elderly.

== See also ==
- Lymphoma
