= Night sweats =

Repeated occurrence of excessive sweating during sleep

- Other names: Sleep sweats, nocturnal hyperhydrosis
- Specialty: Infectious disease, oncology

Night sweats or nocturnal hyperhydrosis is the repeated occurrence of excessive sweating during sleep. The person may or may not also perspire excessively while awake. Hot flashes and night sweats are vasomotor symptoms, and the most common symptoms of menopause.

One of the most common causes of night sweats in women over 40 is the hormonal changes related to menopause and perimenopause. This is a very common occurrence during the menopausal transition years. Over 80% of women experience hot flashes, which may include excessive sweating, during menopause.

Night sweats range from being relatively harmless to a sign of underlying disease. Night sweats may happen because the sleep environment is too warm, either because the bedroom is unusually hot or because there are too many covers on the bed. Night sweats have been associated with a long list of clinical conditions. However, there is very little evidence that supports clinical recommendations for this condition.

== Associated conditions ==
The condition may be a sign of various disease states, including but not exclusive to the following:

- Cancers
  - Lymphoma
  - Leukemia
  - Renal cell carcinoma
  - Polycythemia vera
- Infections
  - HIV/AIDS
  - Tuberculosis
  - Mycobacterium avium-intracellulare infection
  - Infectious mononucleosis
  - Fungal infections (histoplasmosis, coccidioidomycosis)
  - Lung abscess
  - Infective endocarditis
  - Brucellosis
  - Pneumocystis pneumonia (most often – in immunocompromised individuals)
  - Omicron variant of COVID-19
- Endocrine disorders
  - Premature ovarian failure
  - Hyperthyroidism
  - Diabetes mellitus (nocturnal hypoglycemia)
  - Endocrine tumors (pheochromocytoma, carcinoid)
  - Orchiectomy
- Rheumatic disorders
  - Takayasu's arteritis
  - Temporal arteritis
  - Ankylosing spondylitis
- Other
  - Obstructive sleep apnea
  - Gastroesophageal reflux disease
  - Chronic fatigue syndrome
  - Fibromyalgia
  - Granulomatous disease
  - Chronic eosinophilic pneumonia
  - Lymphoid hyperplasia
  - Diabetes insipidus
  - Prinzmetal's angina
  - Anxiety
  - Pregnancy
  - Menopause
- Drugs
  - Antipyretics (salicylates, acetaminophen)
  - Antihypertensives
  - Anabolic–androgenic steroids, in particular trenbolone, and the nandrolones
  - Dinitrophenol – a common side effect
  - Phenothiazines
  - Drug withdrawal: ethanol, benzodiazepines, cannabis, heroin (and other opioids),
- Over-bundling
- Autonomic over-activity
- Inflammatory bowel disease (IBD) – Crohn's disease/ulcerative colitis
