= Immunoblast =

An immunoblast is a lymphocyte that has been activated by an antigen, which will further undergo clonal expansion to increase the number of lymphocytes capable of binding to that antigen. Immunoblasts are the most immature members of the protective cells involved in an immune response.

Activated B cells may differentiate into memory cells or plasma cells, while activated T cells may differentiate into memory cells or effector cells that aid in the immune response.

== Histology ==
The majority of lymphocytes are small and have a thin rim of cytoplasm, 6–9 μm in diameter, about the same size as erythrocytes (diameter 7.5 μm). Large lymphocytes (12–18 μm in diameter) are probably activated, i.e. immunoblasts, cells with a paler and wider rim of cytoplasm and are often mistaken for monocytes. They have moderate-to-abundant basophilic cytoplasm and a prominent, centrally located, trapezoid-shaped single nucleolus which often has fine strands of chromatin attached to the nuclear membrane (‘spider legs’). In some cases, immunoblasts show some morphologic features of plasma cells. Centroblasts are distinguished from immunoblasts by being large lymphoid cells containing a moderate amount of cytoplasm, round to oval vesicular (i.e. containing small fluid-filled sacs) nuclei, vesicular chromatin, and 2–3 small nucleoli often located adjacent to the nuclear membrane. Both immunoblasts and centroblasts are derived from B cells.
