= Epstein–Barr virus nuclear-antigen internal ribosomal entry site =

Epstein–Barr virus nuclear-antigen (EBNA) internal ribosome entry site (IRES)
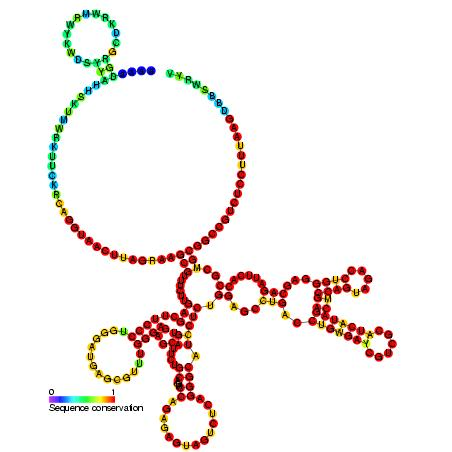
- Predicted secondary structure and sequence conservation of IRES EBNA

Identifiers
- Symbol: IRES_EBNA
- Rfam: RF00448

Other data
- RNA type: Cis-reg; IRES
- Domain(s): Viruses
- GO: GO:0043022
- SO: SO:0000243
- PDB structures: PDBe

The Epstein–Barr virus nuclear-antigen internal ribosome entry site (EBNA IRES) is an internal ribosome entry site (IRES) that is found in an exon in the 5' untranslated region of the Epstein–Barr virus nuclear antigen 1 (EBNA1) gene. The EBNA IRES allows EBNA1 translation to occur under situations where initiation from the 5' cap structure and ribosome scanning is reduced. It is thought that the EBNA IRES is necessary for the regulation of latent-gene expression.

The EBNA IRES is located in the U leader exon, which is a portion of the mRNA of the Epstein–Barr virus common to all four EBNA1 transcripts.

== See also ==
- Epstein–Barr virus stable intronic-sequence RNAs
