= LMP =

LMP may refer to:

== Business and organizations ==
- LMP – Hungary's Green Party (Lehet más a politika), a political party in Hungary formed in 2009 from a civilian initiative
- Lampedusa Airport, an airport in Lampedusa, Italy with IATA code LMP
- London Metropolitan Police, also known as the Metropolitan Police Service (MPS), the police force responsible for law enforcement within Greater London, excluding the City of London

== Music ==
- La Musique Populaire, an American indiepop band
- Lisa Marie Presley (1968–2023), an American singer-songwriter and daughter of Elvis and Priscilla Presley
- London Mozart Players, a British classical chamber orchestra based in Croydon, England

== Places ==
- Lippo Mall Puri, a shopping mall in West Jakarta, Jakarta, Indonesia
- Lacus Mortis Pit, a lunar pit cave

== Sports ==
- Le Mans Prototype, a type of custom-built race car intended for sports car racing and endurance racing
- Liga Mexicana del Pacifico, a Mexican winter baseball league

== Science ==
- Larson-Miller parameter, prediction of the effects of time and temperature on materials
- Epstein–Barr virus latent membrane protein 1, an EBV protein that regulates its own expression and the expression of human genes
- Epstein–Barr virus latent membrane protein 2, an EBV transmembrane protein

== Technology ==
- Link Manager Protocol, a protocol for initiating and controlling the link between Bluetooth terminals
- Lithium Metal Polymer battery, a type of lithium-ion polymer battery
- Lunar Module Pilot, the pilot of Apollo Lunar Module during Apollo program missions

== Other uses ==
- Licensed massage practitioner, or Licensed massage therapist
- Last menstrual period, see Gestational age, the first day of the menstrual period prior to conceiving, used to calculate expected date of delivery
- Last mile provider, provider of the final leg of a telecommunications network terminating at the subscriber's premises
- Lighting Management Plan, in the context of resolving light pollution, inter alia
- Lemon meringue pie, a dessert consisting of lemon curd and meringue fillings in a shortcrust pastry
- "Like My Post", an invitation for readers to request an action by providing single-click feedback on a social website
- Locational marginal pricing, also known as nodal pricing, a pricing concept used in some deregulated electricity markets

== See also ==
- Lmp1 (disambiguation)
