= LMP1 =

LMP1 may refer to:

- Le Mans Prototype, a type of sports prototype race car

- Panoz LMP-1 Roadster-S, a Le Mans Prototype built for Panoz in 1999
- GMS Durango LMP1, a Le Mans Prototype built for Durango by GMS in 2000

- Epstein–Barr virus latent membrane protein 1
- LIM Mineralization Protein-1, an intracellular protein involved in the bone morphogenetic protein (BMP) pathway signaling and ossification

== See also ==
- LMP (disambiguation)
