= Mitochondrial ribosomal protein S12 =

Protein-coding gene in the species Homo sapiens

MRPS12

Identifiers
- Aliases: MRPS12, MPR-S12, MT-RPS12, RPMS12, RPS12, RPSM12, mitochondrial ribosomal protein S12
- External IDs: OMIM: 603021; MGI: 1346333; GeneCards: MRPS12
Available structures
PDB	Ortholog search: PDBe RCSB
PDB	List of PDB id codes 3J9M

Gene location (Human)
Chr.	Chromosome 19 (human)
Band	19q13.2	Start	38,930,944 bp
Band	19q13.2	End	38,933,168 bp

Gene location (Mouse)
Chr.	Chromosome 7 (mouse)
Band	7|7 B1	Start	28,439,066 bp
Band	7|7 B1	End	28,441,245 bp
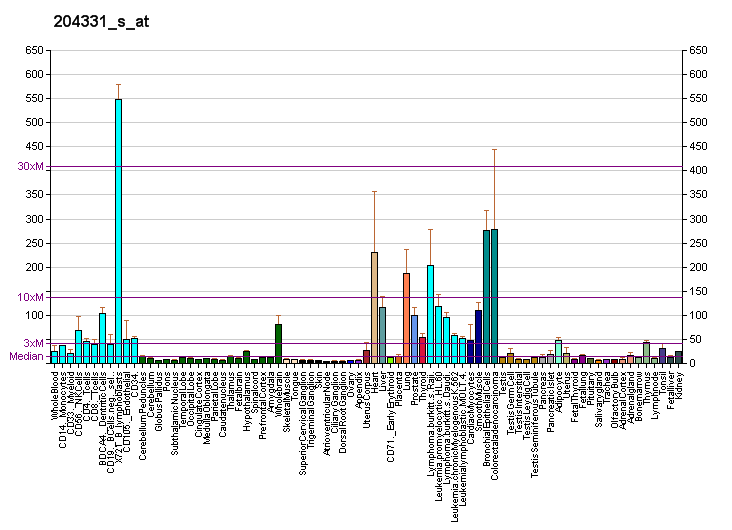
RNA expression pattern
Bgee	Human / Mouse (ortholog); Top expressed in: apex of heart; mucosa of transverse colon; left ventricle; right auricle of heart; right lobe of liver; human kidney; right adrenal gland; gastrocnemius muscle; left adrenal gland; body of stomach / Top expressed in: embryo; right kidney; yolk sac; embryo; islet of Langerhans; parotid gland; Ileal epithelium; epiblast; seminal vesicula; left lobe of liver; More reference expression data
BioGPS	More reference expression data
Gene ontology
Molecular function	protein binding; RNA binding; structural constituent of ribosome
Cellular component	small ribosomal subunit; mitochondrial inner membrane; ribosome; intracellular anatomical structure; mitochondrial ribosome; mitochondrion; mitochondrial small ribosomal subunit
Biological process	mitochondrial translational elongation; mitochondrial translational termination; protein biosynthesis; mitochondrial translation
Sources:Amigo / QuickGO
Orthologs
Databases	NCBI: entry; OMA: entry
Species	Human	Mouse
Entrez	6183	24030
Ensembl	ENSG00000283018; ENSG00000128626	ENSMUSG00000045948
UniProt	O15235	O35680
RefSeq (mRNA)	NM_033363; NM_021107; NM_033362	NM_011885; NM_001360250; NM_001360252; NM_001360254
RefSeq (protein)	NP_066930; NP_203526; NP_203527	NP_036015; NP_001347179; NP_001347181; NP_001347183
Location (UCSC)	Chr 19: 38.93 – 38.93 Mb	Chr 7: 28.44 – 28.44 Mb
PubMed search
- Wikidata
View/Edit Human	View/Edit Mouse

28S ribosomal protein S12, mitochondrial is a protein that in humans is encoded by the MRPS12 gene.

Mammalian mitochondrial ribosomal proteins are encoded by nuclear genes and help in protein synthesis within the mitochondrion. Mitochondrial ribosomes (mitoribosomes) consist of a small 28S subunit and a large 39S subunit. They have an estimated 75% protein to rRNA composition compared to prokaryotic ribosomes, where this ratio is reversed. Another difference between mammalian mitoribosomes and prokaryotic ribosomes is that the latter contain a 5S rRNA. Among different species, the proteins comprising the mitoribosome differ greatly in sequence, and sometimes in biochemical properties, which prevents easy recognition by sequence homology. This gene encodes a 28S subunit protein that belongs to the ribosomal protein S12P family. The encoded protein is a key component of the ribosomal small subunit and controls the decoding fidelity and susceptibility to aminoglycoside antibiotics. The gene for mitochondrial seryl-tRNA synthetase is located upstream and adjacent to this gene, and both genes are possible candidates for the autosomal dominant deafness gene (DFNA4). Splice variants that differ in the 5' UTR have been found for this gene; all three variants encode the same protein.
