= Ribonuclease M5 =

Identifiers
- EC no.: 3.1.26.8
- CAS no.: 62253-00-3

Databases
- IntEnz: IntEnz view
- BRENDA: BRENDA entry
- ExPASy: NiceZyme view
- KEGG: KEGG entry
- MetaCyc: metabolic pathway
- PRIAM: profile
- PDB structures: RCSB PDB PDBe PDBsum
Search
- PMC: articles
- PubMed: articles
- NCBI: proteins

Ribonuclease M5 (EC 3.1.26.8, RNase M5, 5S ribosomal maturation nuclease, 5S ribosomal RNA maturation endonuclease) is an enzyme. This enzyme catalyses the following chemical reaction

Endonucleolytic cleavage of RNA, removing 21 and 42 nucleotides, respectively, from the 5'- and 3'-termini of a 5S-rRNA precursor

This enzyme converts the 5S-rRNA precursor from Bacillus subtilis into 5S-rRNA.
