= VCA =

VCA may refer to:

- Vehicle Certification Agency, a UK government agency.
- Van Cleef & Arpels
- Video Content Analysis
- Voltage-controlled amplifier also called variable-gain amplifier
- Victoria College of Art, a Canadian art school
- Victorian College of the Arts, an Australian educational institution
- Victorian College of the Arts Student Union, the student union of the Victorian College of the Arts
- Vidarbha Cricket Association Ground, a stadium in India
- Vidarbha Cricket Association Stadium, a stadium in India
- V Corps Artillery, a unit in the United States Army
- VCA Animal Hospitals, a veterinary clinic chain in the United States
- VCA Pictures, an American pornographic movie studio
- Veteran Corps of Artillery, a patriotic society in the United States
- Can Tho International Airport IATA code
- Viral capsid antigen

== See also ==
- Victorian College of the Arts Secondary School, Melbourne, Australia
