= Epstein–Barr virus nuclear antigen 3 =

Family of viral proteins

Identifiers
- Symbol: EBV-NA3
- Pfam: PF05009
- InterPro: IPR007706
- SCOP2: 1m05 / SCOPe / SUPFAM
Available protein structures:
- Pfam: structures / ECOD
- PDB: RCSB PDB; PDBe; PDBj
- PDBsum: structure summary

The Epstein–Barr virus nuclear antigen 3 (EBNA-3) is a family of viral proteins associated with the Epstein–Barr virus. A typical EBV genome contains three such proteins:

- EBNA-3A (P12977, EBNA-3; BLRF3-BERF1)
- EBNA-3B (P03203, EBNA-4; BERF2A-BERF2B)
- EBNA-3C (P03204, EBNA-6, EBNA-4B; BERF3-BERF4)

These genes also bind the host RBP-Jκ protein.

EBNA-3C can recruit a ubiquitin ligase and has been shown to target cell-cycle regulators such as retinoblastoma protein (pRb).
