= Epigenetics of human herpesvirus latency =

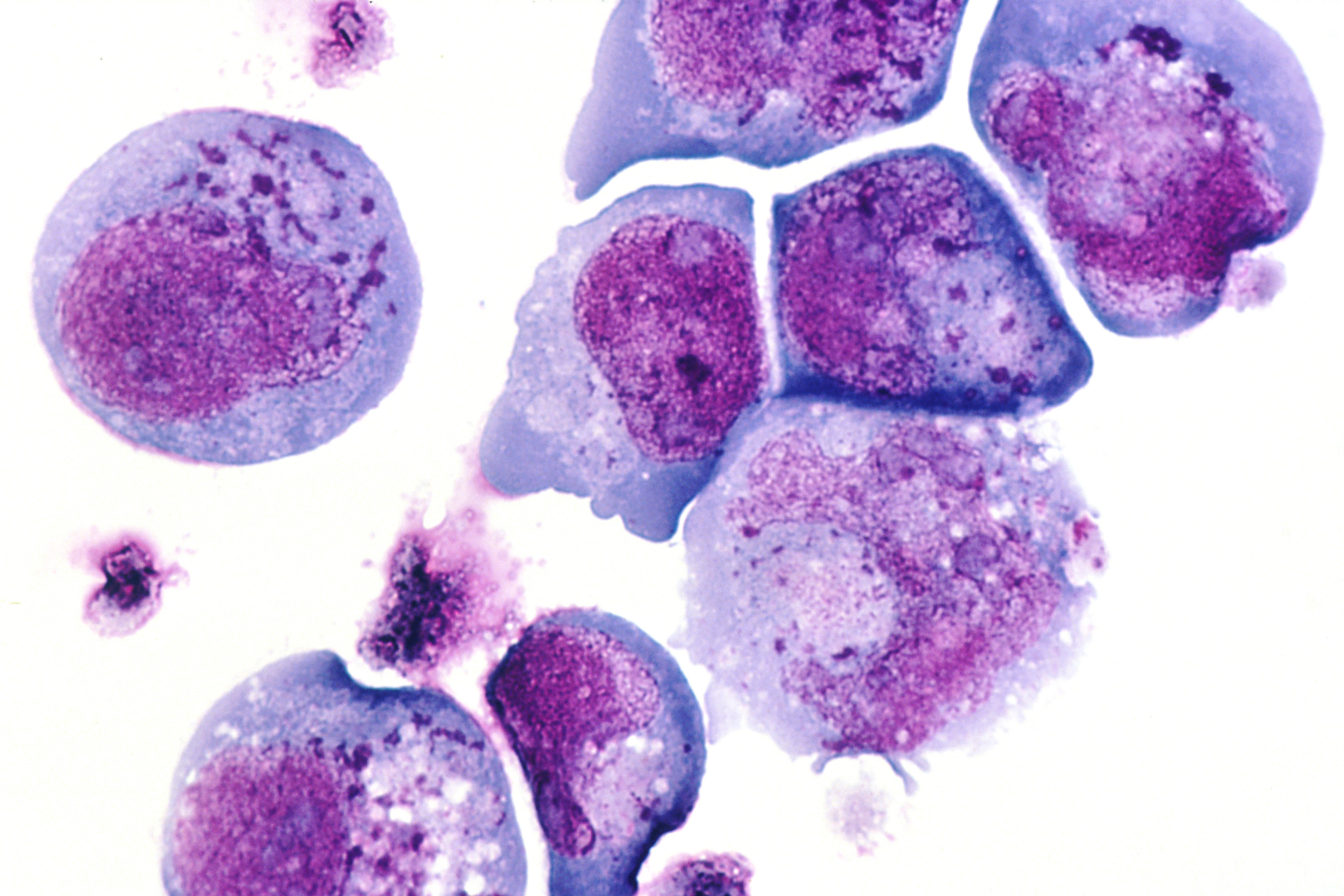
Human herpes virus

Human herpes viruses, also known as HHVs, are part of a family of DNA viruses that cause several diseases in humans. One of the most notable functions of this virus family is their ability to enter a latent phase and lay dormant within animals for extended periods of time. The mechanism that controls this is very complex because expression of viral proteins during latency is decreased a great deal, meaning that the virus must have transcription of its genes repressed. There are many factors and mechanisms that control this process and epigenetics is one way this is accomplished. Epigenetics refers to persistent changes in expression patterns that are not caused by changes to the DNA sequence. This happens through mechanisms such as methylation and acetylation of histones, DNA methylation, and non-coding RNAs (ncRNA). Altering the acetylation of histones creates changes in expression by changing the binding affinity of histones to DNA, making it harder or easier for transcription machinery to access the DNA. Methyl and acetyl groups can also act as binding sites for transcription factors and enzymes that further modify histones or alter the DNA itself.

== Herpes virus life cycle ==
Human herpesviruses are all double stranded DNA viruses that enter the nucleus of the host cell. HHVs replicate in the nucleus of the infected cells and can enter both a lytic and latent phase. In the lytic phase, the viral genes are being actively transcribed and many times ultimately lead to cell death. In the lytic phase the virus is able to spread to other hosts due to open sores and other such mechanisms. In the latent phase the amount of viral transcript is heavily reduced. In this phase the host will show little to no signs of virus infection. This state can be maintained for very long periods of time and infection with HHVs can last a lifetime.

== Herpes simplex virus 1 and 2 ==
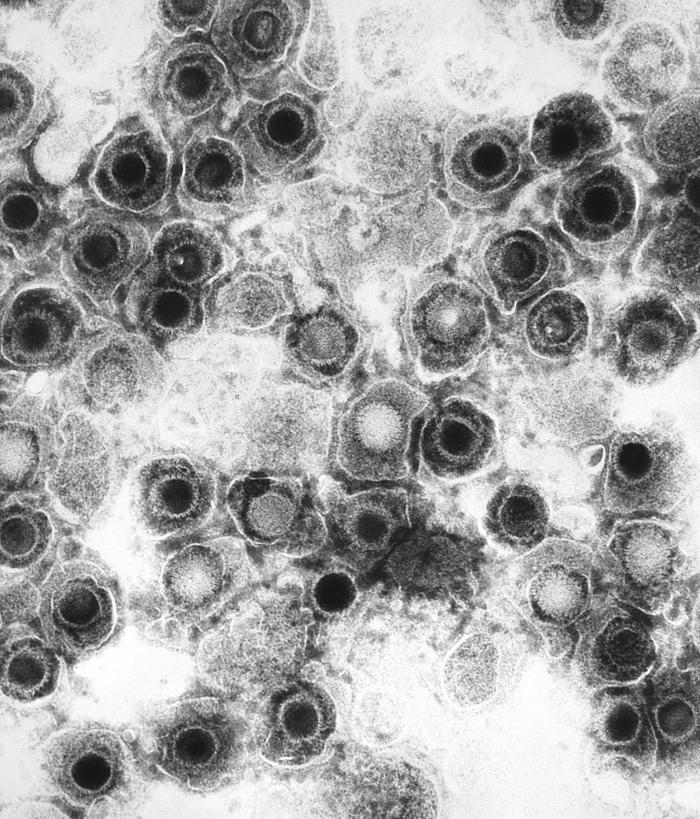
Herpes simplex virions

Herpes simplex virus 1 and 2 (HSV 1 and HSV 2) are part of the alpha subfamily of herpesviruses. The lytic phase of infection occurs within mucoepithelial cells while the latent infection of these cells occurs in neurons. These two viruses are the cause of oral and genital herpes.

Latency is maintained in a variety of ways, one of which is the latency-associated transcript, or LAT. This long non-coding RNA accumulates in the latent phase and has been found to suppress the lytic genes. It is also possible that the LAT transcript plays a role in determining which neurons become infected and maintain the lytic phase. LAT manages this suppression of the viral genome through miRNAs that block viral transcription factors such as ICP0 and ICP4 that play a very important role in the lytic phase of infection. Another mechanism that is used to maintain the latent phase is chromatin remodeling. During the latent phase, researchers have found more methylated chromatin in the lytic genes and less acetylated chromatin, whereas in the LAT region there is less methylation and more acetylation found during latency. This was reversed during the lytic phase, Suggesting that this change of chromatin structure is used to control and maintain the lytic and latent phases.

== Varicella zoster virus ==
Varicella zoster virus (VZV) is a member of the alpha subfamily of herpesviruses and is responsible for the human diseases of chicken pox and shingles. These viruses have their lytic phase in mucoepithelial cells and are latent in neuronal cells.Unlike HSV 1 and 2, there has not been any LAT found in the VZV latent cells. Instead, it appears that the main way that expression of viral transcripts is maintained at a lower level during latency is through chromatin structure. There are 5 transcripts identified during latent infection of VZV. Open reading frames (ORFs) 21, 29, 62, 63, and 66 are all expressed with 62 and 63 being the most abundant. The promoters of these two genes, ORFs 62 and 63, contain large amounts of acetylated H3K9, which makes these genes euchromatic. This contrasts other genes normally found in lytic infection that are not associated with acetylated H3K9 histones during latency. This means that these genes are controlled through a mechanism affecting the chromatin structure that allows them to be expressed in the latent phase. The mechanism of how this happens is not clearly understood and research is currently being done in this area.

== Epstein–Barr virus ==
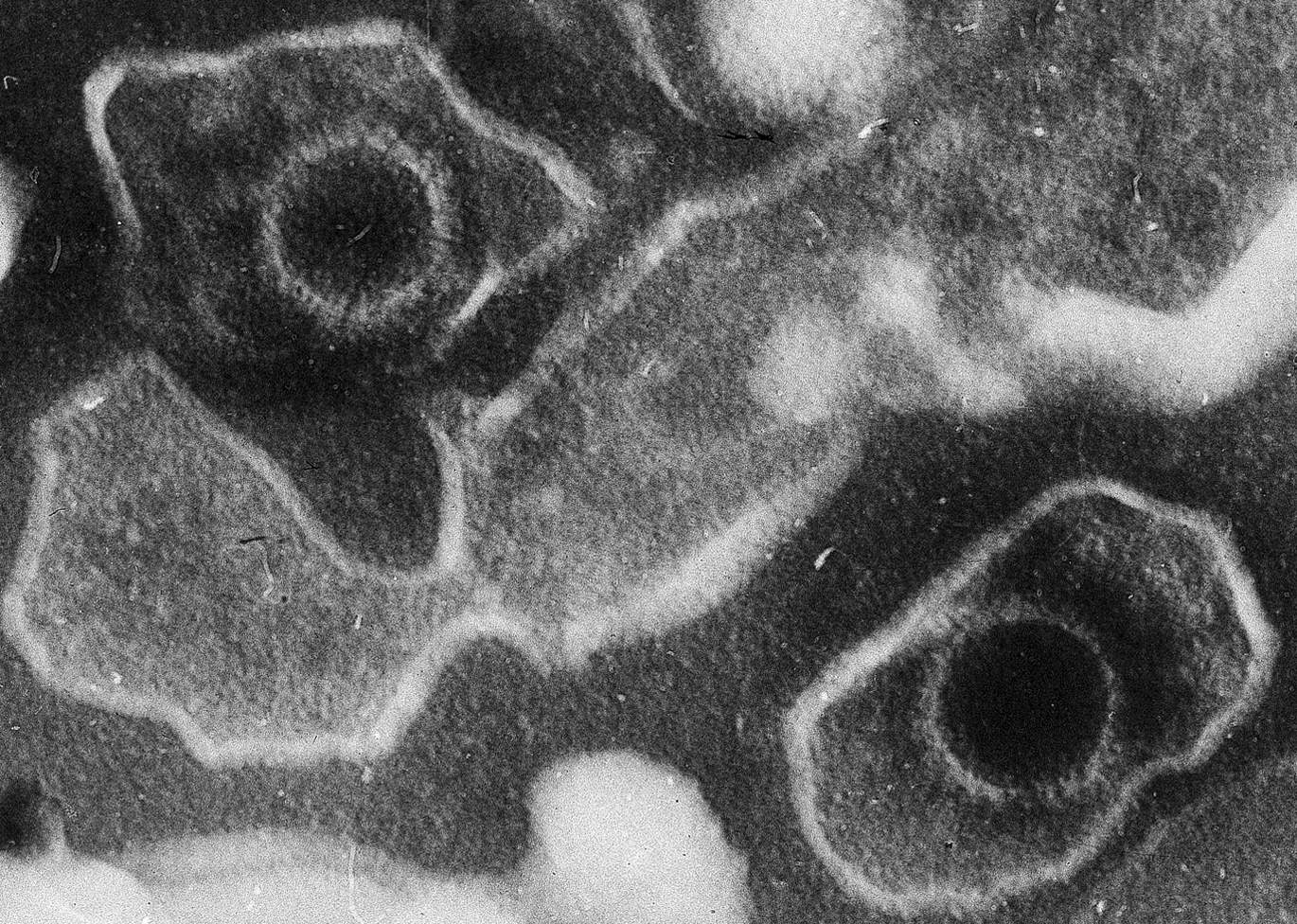
Epstein–Barr virus

Epstein–Barr virus (EBV) is a member of the gammaherpesvirus subfamily. EBV is responsible for infectious mononucleosis and is linked to several forms of cancer. EBV infects both B cells and epithelial cells and is able to undergo latency in both of these cells. A remarkable fact concerning the latency of EBV is that different patterns of expression exist while it is latent, known as latency programs.

One of the ways that latency is achieved and maintained is through histone modification. It is known that methylation of histones often serve as marks that cause the formation of heterochromatin, an inactive form of chromatin, while acetylation often marks euchromatin, an active form of chromatin. In EBV, The amount and location of the histone modifications is different for each latency program. There are several promoter regions which are the key targets of this histone modification in each of these programs. There are the Cp and Qp promoter regions. The Cp promoter promotes the transcription of all the EBNA genes from a polycistronic mRNA. The Q promoter (Qp) promotes the transcription of EBNA1. In type I latency, the Qp is acetylated and active while the Cp region is methylated and inactive. The opposite is true in type III latency where the Cp region is active and the Qp region is inactive. In both of these types of latency, H3K27me is slightly enriched in the lytic immediate early promoters. This suggests that facultative heterochromatin interacts with the polycomb repressive complex in order to limit lytic reactivation.

== Cytomegalovirus ==
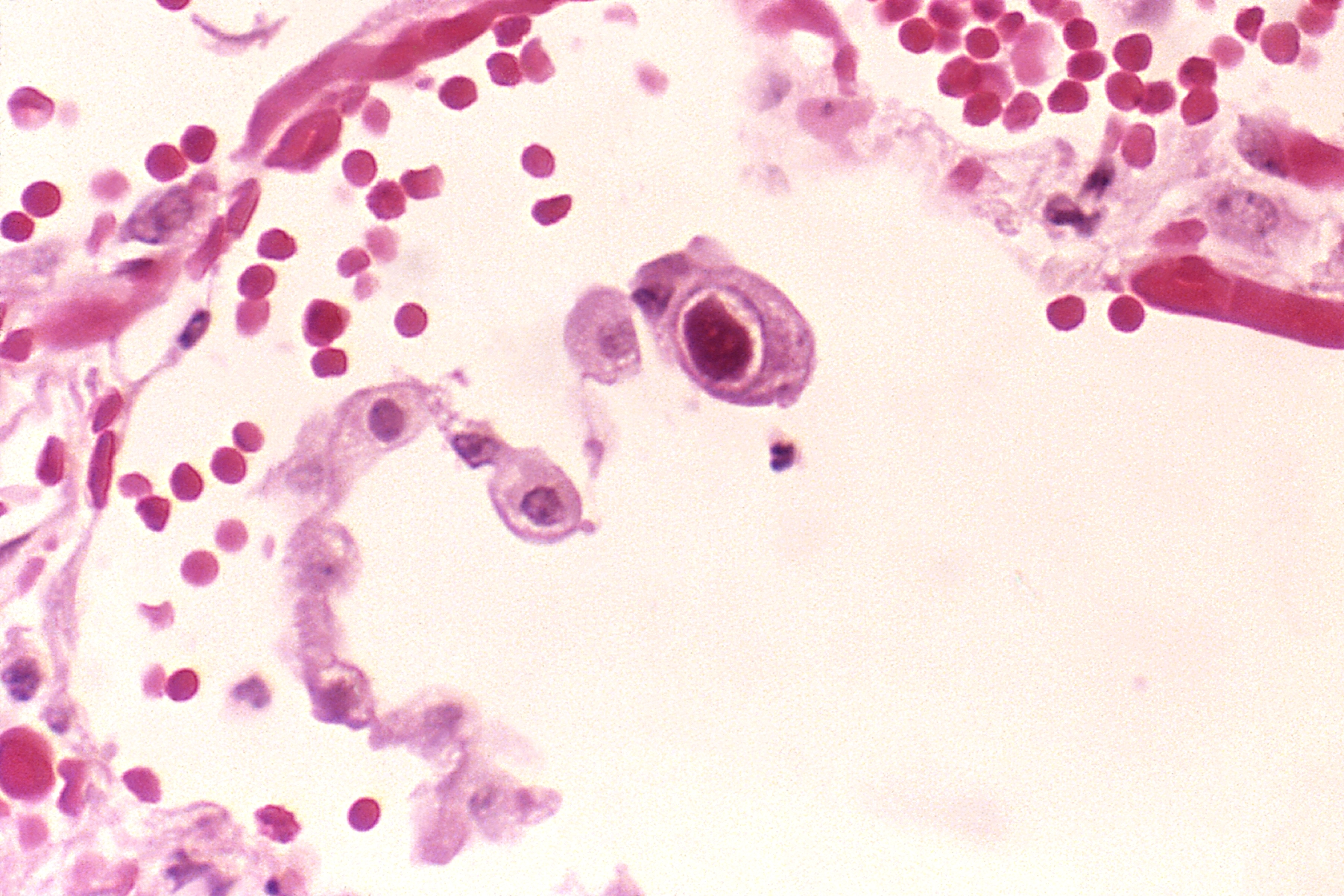
Cytomegalovirus

Cytomegalovirus (CMV) is a member of the betaherpesvirinae subfamily. CMV is responsible for a range of diseases, but mainly affects the immunocompromised. The primary targets for infection include monocytes, lymphocytes, and epithelial cells with the known sites of latency including monocytes and lymphocytes.One epigenetic mechanism employed in the control of latency for CMV is heterochromatization of the viral genome. Studies have shown that during latency the IE promoter is heterochromatic while the LUNA promoter is euchromatic. It has also been found that latently infected cells are more enriched for histones relative to the cellular genes. This keeps the transcriptional machinery from being able to access the viral transcripts.

This control over the chromatin is brought about and maintained by recruited transcriptional repressors. These complexes, which are composed of enzymes such as histone deacetylases (HDACs), bind to the major immediate-early promoter (MIEP) of CMV and condense the DNA and prevent any remodeling. HDACs appear to be important for the continued maintenance of latency as HDAC inhibitors induce a lytic infection. It is also of not to mention that while chromatin methylation is utilized in this control mechanism, methylation of the DNA has not been observed. This is important due to the fact that HDACs do not function on their own but instead are part of larger co-repressor complexes that are recruited by methylated DNA or transcription factors which bind to specific sequences on DNA. Since there is no methylated DNA, it is likely that transcription factors are used to recruit these co-repressor complexes.

== Kaposi's sarcoma-associated herpes virus ==
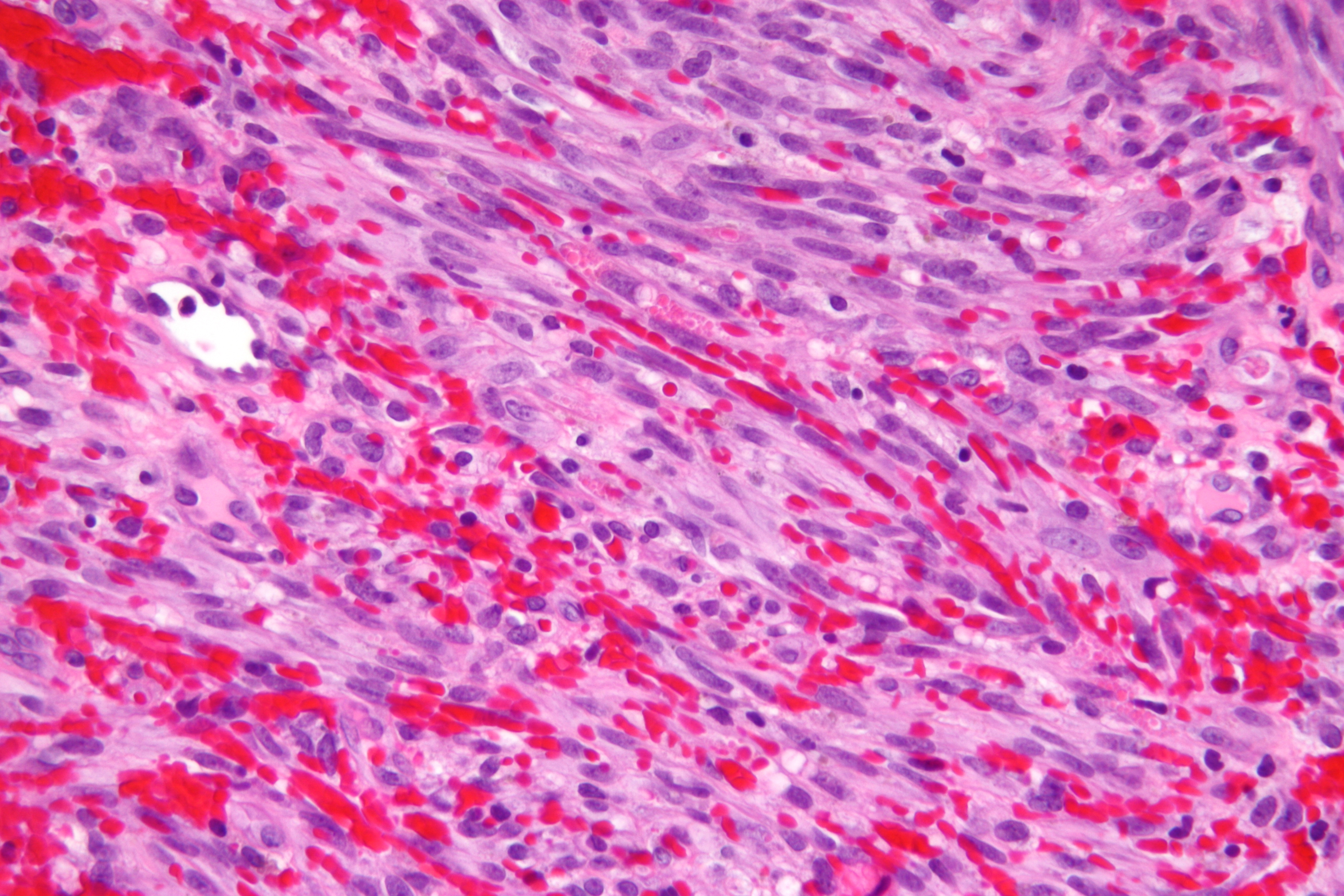
Kaposi sarcoma

Kaposi's sarcoma-associated herpesvirus (KSHV) is a part of the gammaherpesvirus subfamily. It undergoes lytic infection in lymphocytes and latency in B cells. It causes Kaposi's sarcoma and primary effusion lymphoma. KSHV is one of eight known human cancer-causing viruses. The control of KSHV latency is most notably controlled by a set of viral miRNAs. During latency there are only a few transcripts that are produced. These transcripts include latency-associated nuclear antigen (LANA), viral cyclin (vCyclin), vFLIP (ORF71), kaposin (K12), and 12 miRNAs.

One mechanism for this control is that the miRNAs down regulate the lytic activator protein known as Rta or orf50. This down regulation is accomplished through increasing the amount of methyltransferases and CpG methylation. The main miRNA responsible for this is miR-K12-5 which interacts with orf50 through its 3′ untranslated region (UTR). These miRNAs also change the methylation of the histones in the viral genome. In the latent phase there is a lot of H3K9 trimethylation near the terminal repeats, which is an indication of heterochromatin in these areas. Another of these miRNAs, miR-K12-4-5p, targets retinoblastoma-like protein 2 (Rbl2). Rbl2 regulates DNA methyltransferases (DNMTs), which in turn regulates the amount of DNA methylation. miR-K12-4-5p has been shown to upregulate the amount of DNMTs which increases DNA methylation and allows the latent phase of the infection to continue.
