= Epstein–Barr virus small nucleolar RNA 1 =

Human herpesvirus 1 small nucleolar RNA
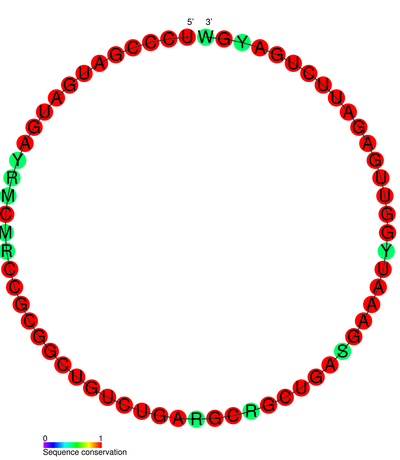
- Sequence concservation of v-snoRNA1

Identifiers
- Symbol: v-snoRNA1
- Rfam: RF01516

Other data
- RNA type: snoRNA
- PDB structures: PDBe

V-snoRNA1 is a C/D box small nucleolar RNA (snoRNA) identified in B lymphocytes infected with the Epstein–Barr virus (human herpesvirus 4 (HHV-4)). This snoRNA is the first known example of a snoRNA expressed from a viral genome. It is homologous to eukaryotic snoRNAs because it contains the C and D boxes sequence motifs (RUGAUGA and CUGA) but lacks a terminal stem-loop structure. The nucleolar localization of v-snoRNA1 was determined by in situ hybridization. V-snoRNA1 can form into a ribonucleoprotein complex (snoRNP) as co-immunoprecipitation (CoIP) assays showed that this snoRNA interacts with the snoRNA core proteins: fibrillarin, Nop56, Nop58. It has also been proposed that this snoRNA may act as a miRNA-like precursor that is processed into 24-nucleotide-sized RNA fragments that target the untranslated region at the 3'-end (the 3'-UTR) of viral DNA polymerase mRNA.

== See also ==
- Epstein–Barr virus stable intronic sequence RNAs
