= Epstein–Barr virus stable intronic-sequence RNAs =

Epstein–Barr virus stable intronic sequence RNA

Identifiers
- Symbol: EBVSIS

Other data
- RNA type: sisRNA
- Domain: Herpesviridae;
- PDB structures: PDBe

Epstein–Barr virus stable intronic-sequence RNAs (ebv-sisRNAs) are a class of non-coding RNAs generated by repeat introns in the Epstein–Barr virus. After EBERs 1 and 2, ebv-sisRNA-1 is the third most abundant EBV RNA generated during a highly oncogenic form of virus latency (latency III). Conservation of ebv-sisRNA sequence and secondary structure between EBV and other herpesviruses suggest shared functions in latent infection.

== Background ==
The Epstein–Barr virus (EBV) infects as many as 95% of adults and is the infectious agent responsible for mononucleosis ("mono"). Infection with EBV results in lifelong. Latent infections are "dormant", meaning no active virions are produced, however the virus generates proteins and RNAs to modulate host-virus interactions that maintain latent infection. In ways yet to be fully determined, these interactions make EBV-infected B cells more prone to becoming cancerous (e.g. Hodgkin's lymphoma, Burkitt's lymphoma, and nasopharyngeal carcinoma). Non-coding RNAs (ncRNAs) have a role in this process. Structured ncRNAs are of particular interest as they serve a wide array of functions, which are the focus of intensive efforts to characterize and archive in such projects as Rfam.

A recent study of ncRNAs in EBV using bioinformatics and RNA-Seq identified multiple regions within its genome likely to contain functional RNAs. These regions included EBER-1 and -2, v-snoRNA1, and most of the known viral miRNAs. In addition to these known EBV ncRNAs, this analysis identified new RNAs, including two stable intronic sequence (sis)RNAs. Introns, typically are rapidly degraded in the cell, but can persist and accumulate to high abundance when they serve a functional role. Such sisRNAs have been found in Xenopus oocytes. Stable introns are also found in other herpesviruses, for example, the HHV Latency Associated Transcript, which plays important roles in the maintenance of virus latency.

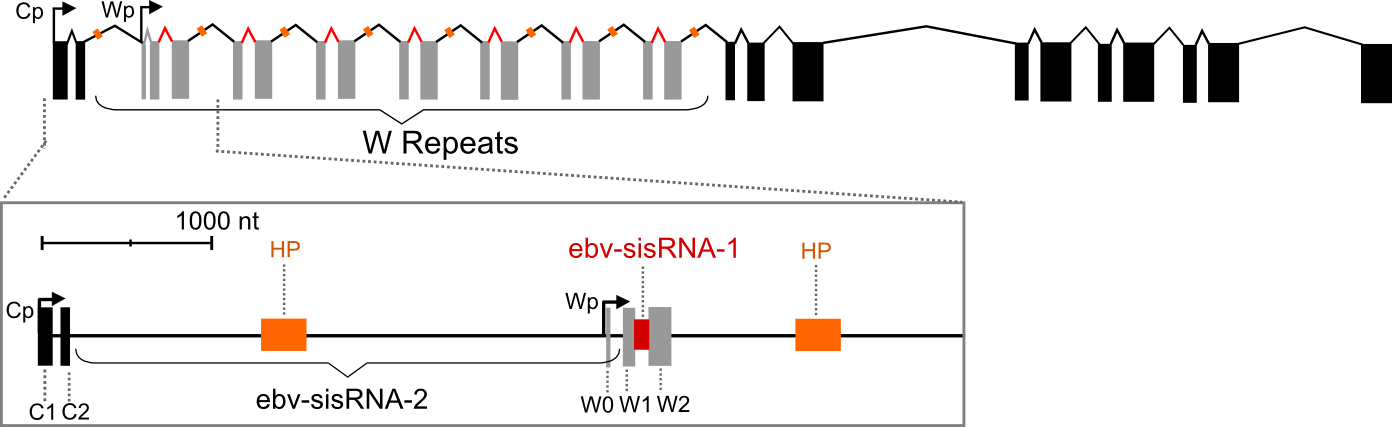
Figure 1. EBV latency III transcript showing location of EBV W repeat stable introns.

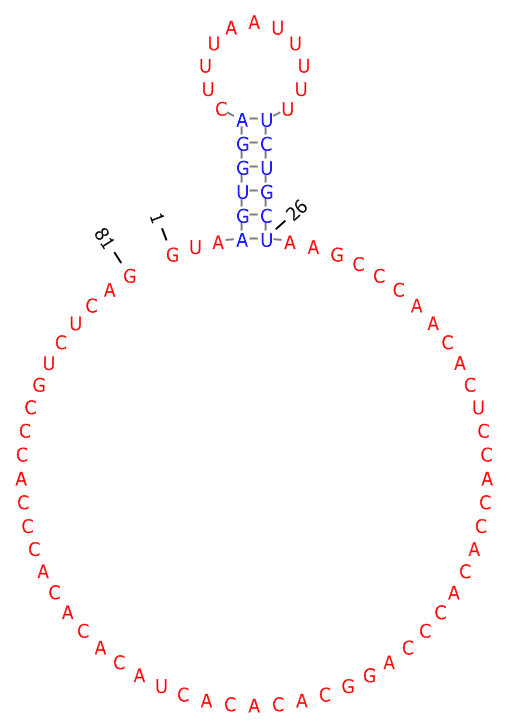
Figure 2. Secondary structure of ebv-sisRNA-1

In EBV, sisRNAs are generated from a region known as the W repeats. This region is transcribed during a type of viral latency that is highly oncogenic (latency type III) and also in a rare type of latency (Wp-restricted latency) observed in ~15% of endemic Burkitt's lymphoma. Splicing of these W repeat transcripts produces a short intron and a long intron (Fig. 1), both of which accumulate to high abundance in EBV-infected human B cells. Indeed, ebv-sisRNA-1 is the third most abundantly produced EBV RNA after EBER1 and EBER2, which are highly expressed in EBV-infected cells., The presence of these RNAs in a pathogenic form of latency suggests roles in EBV-associated cancers.

== ebv-sisRNA-1 ==
The short W repeat intron, rather than being spliced and rapidly degraded, persists after splicing and is the third most abundant EBV-produced small ncRNA in latency III. Nucleotides 4 to 26 of ebv-sisRNA-1 form a short hairpin loop that presents a Uridine-rich sequence motif (a possible platform for protein interactions) into the loop. The remainder of the sequence is unlikely to form stable RNA structure. This unstructured stretch of sequence may be exposed to allow for interactions with nucleic acids or other proteins. The sisRNA sequence is ~100% conserved in EBV strains and homology extends to include other lymphocryptoviruses. The hairpin structure is also conserved and includes structure-preserving mutations in its stem.

== ebv-sisRNA-2 ==
Ebv-sisRNA-2 is generated from the long W repeat intron. Evidence of stable and conserved RNA structure covers ~40% of this RNA and one region can fold into a remarkably long (586 nt) and thermodynamically stable hairpin loop (Fig. 2). In addition to EBV strains, where the hairpin is ~100% conserved in sequence, this structure is also found in other lymphocryptoviruses. Despite high divergence of sequence between these homologous RNAs, the long hairpin structure is well conserved. This suggests that this RNA plays an important functional role in ebv-sisRNA-2. The size of ebv-sisRNA-2 (2,791 nt) more closely resembles that the HHV Latency Associated Transcript) and may perhaps play a similar role in the maintenance of virus latency.

Figure 3. Schematic of giant hairpin that folds within ebv-sisRNA-2
