= Epstein–Barr virus–encoded small RNAs =

EBER1
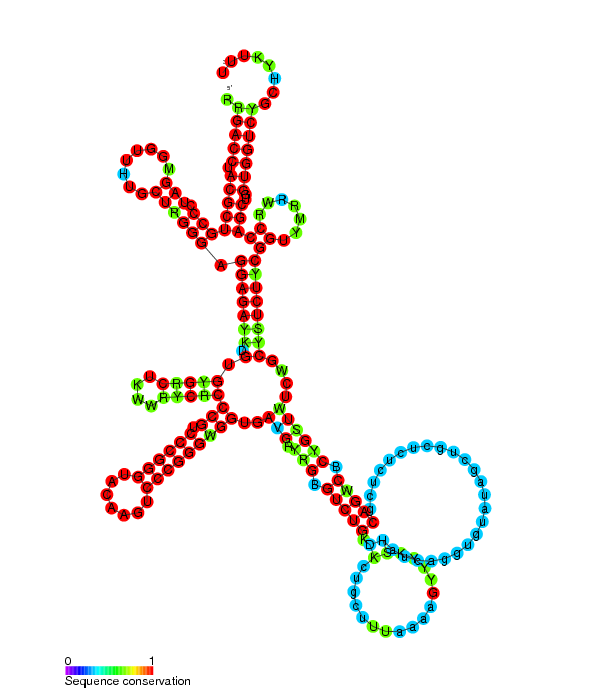
- Conserved secondary structure of EBER1.

Identifiers
- Symbol: EBER1
- Rfam: RF01789

Other data
- RNA type: Gene
- Domain: Epstein–Barr virus
- PDB structures: PDBe

The Epstein–Barr virus–encoded small RNAs (EBERs) are small non-coding RNAs localized in the nucleus of human cells infected with Epstein–Barr virus (EBV). First discovered in 1981, EBERs are the most abundant RNAs present in infected cells. EBERs interact with several host proteins to form ribonucleoprotein (RNP) complexes. Although a precise function for EBERs remains elusive, roles in transformation and oncogenesis are proposed. They have also been shown to be present in exosomes released from infected cells and could be involved in cell to cell interaction.

== Background ==
EBER1 and EBER2 are short, 167 and 172 nucleotides in length respectively, nuclear-enriched non-coding RNAs. These two RNAs are transcribed by the host's RNA polymerase III during latent infection of EBV.

EBERs 1 and 2 can be deleted from the viral genome without noticeable phenotypic changes, though this has never been found deleted in nature. EBER expression alone can induce tumours in severe combined immunodeficient mice.

== EBER1 ==
EBER1 associates with human ribosomal protein L22 and causes this protein to move from the nucleolus to the nucleoplasm. EBER1 also specifically interacts with at least three host hnRNPs (A1, A2/B1 and D/AUF1).

== EBER2 ==
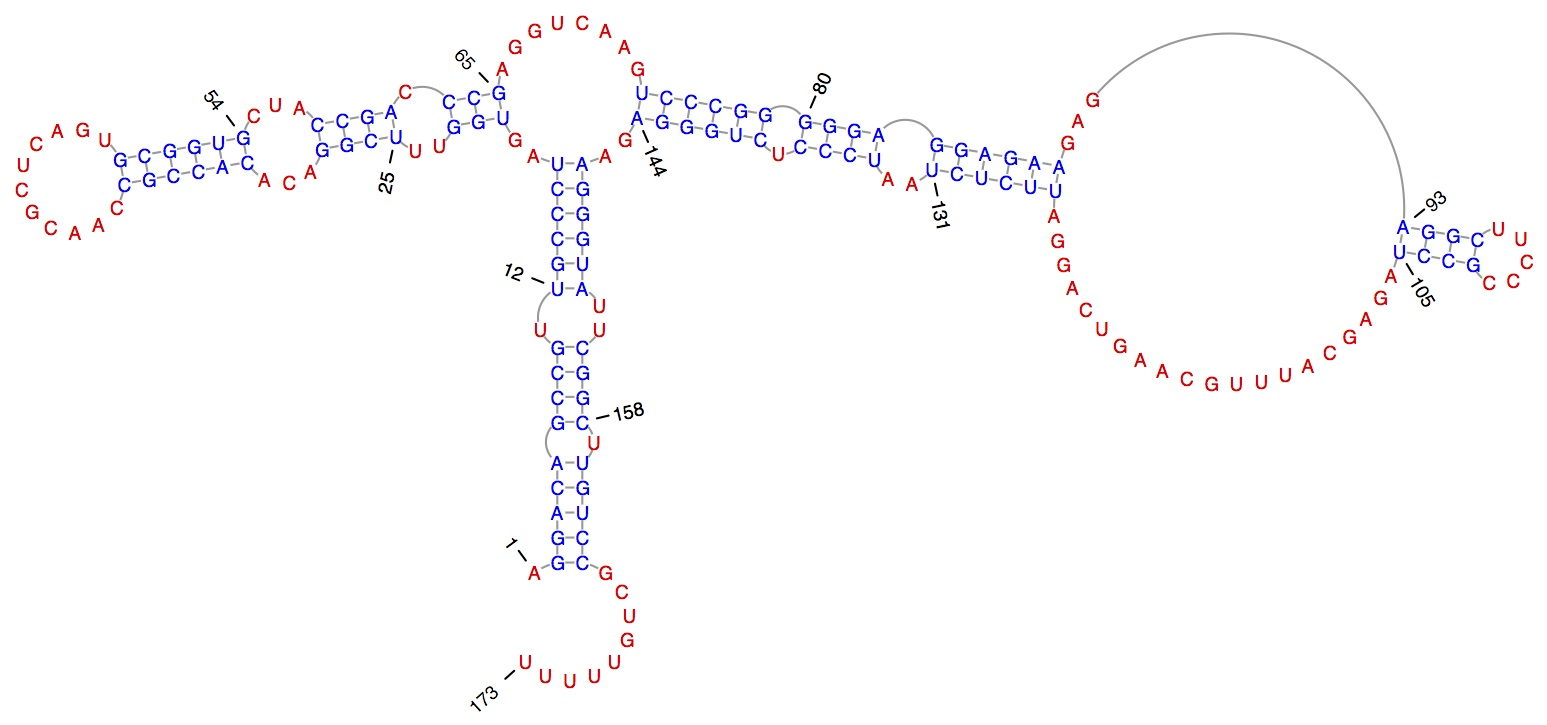
Consensus secondary structure for EBER2

Similar to EBER1, EBER2 is very highly expressed in latently infected cells. Unlike EBER1, the sequence of EBER2 is less conserved in related herpesviruses (~50% conservation). However, the secondary structure of EBER2 is highly conserved (see Figure 1). EBER2 is only known to bind cellular proteins (specifically, the La domain) at its terminal stretch of repeated uridines; however, it is believed that the other features of EBER2, particularly its two long and highly conserved stem-loops, may also serve as binding sites for yet unknown proteins.

Richard Ambinder pioneered the application of EBER in situ hybridisation to the detection of Epstein-Barr Virus in clinical specimens in 1990. The abundance of EBER targets in cells with latent EBV infection cells and ease of non-isotopic methodology in formalin-fixed paraffin wax embedded tissue sections made EBER in situ hybridisation eminently suited to clinical practice. EBER detection has become an integral component of routine diagnostic histopathology.
