= RNA-binding protein RO60 =

Protein found in humans

RO60

Identifiers
- Aliases: RO60, RORNP, SSA2, TROVE domain family member 2, Ro60, Y RNA binding protein, TROVE2
- External IDs: OMIM: 600063; MGI: 106652; GeneCards: RO60

Gene location (Human)
Chr.	Chromosome 1 (human)
Band	1q31.2	Start	193,059,454 bp
Band	1q31.2	End	193,091,777 bp

Gene location (Mouse)
Chr.	Chromosome 1 (mouse)
Band	1 F|1 62.54 cM	Start	143,626,528 bp
Band	1 F|1 62.54 cM	End	143,652,806 bp
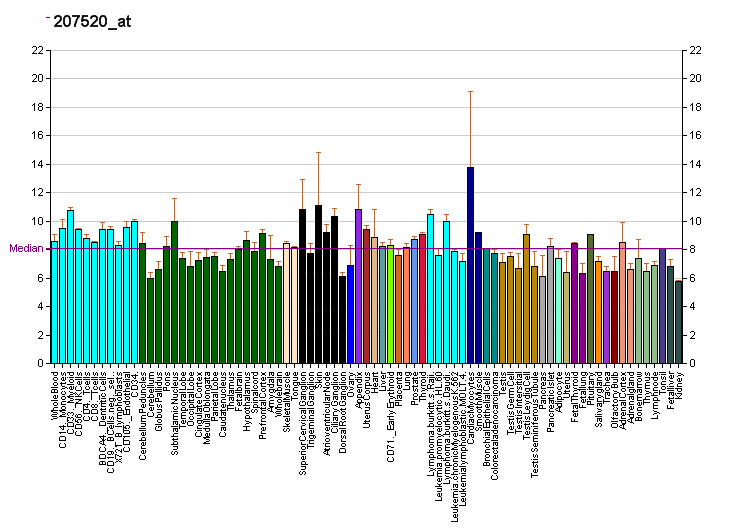

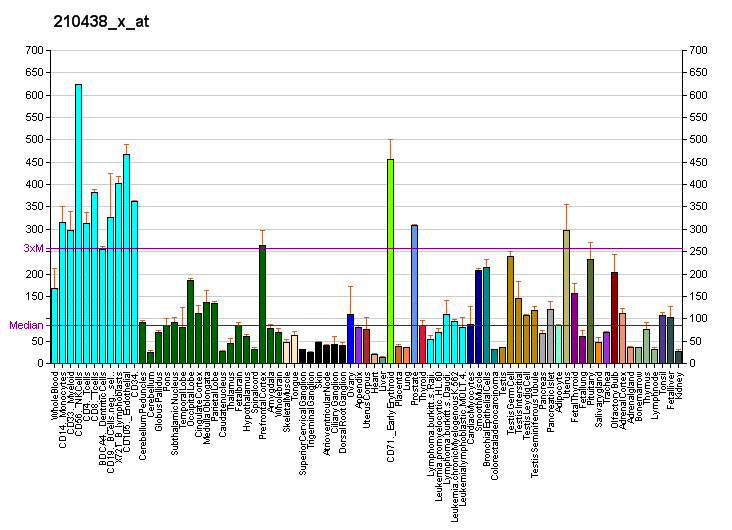

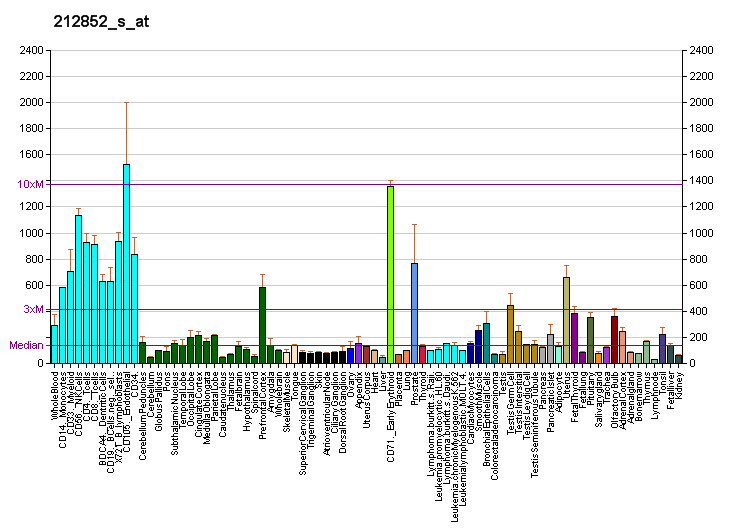
RNA expression pattern
Bgee	Human / Mouse (ortholog); Top expressed in: nipple; external globus pallidus; dorsal motor nucleus of vagus nerve; inferior ganglion of vagus nerve; inferior olivary nucleus; optic nerve; sperm; pars reticulata; renal medulla; trabecular bone / Top expressed in: superior surface of tongue; gallbladder; Rostral migratory stream; molar; cerebellar vermis; pineal gland; lobe of cerebellum; trigeminal ganglion; cingulate gyrus; habenula; More reference expression data
BioGPS	More reference expression data
Gene ontology
Molecular function	U2 snRNA binding; metal ion binding; RNA binding
Cellular component	nucleus; cytoplasm; nucleoplasm; cytosol; ribonucleoprotein complex
Biological process	immune system development; transcription by RNA polymerase III; smoothened signaling pathway; response to UV; cilium assembly; cell projection organization; regulation of gene expression; cellular response to interferon-alpha
Sources:Amigo / QuickGO
Orthologs
Databases	NCBI: entry; OMA: entry
Species	Human	Mouse
Entrez	6738	20822
Ensembl	ENSG00000116747	ENSMUSG00000018199
UniProt	P10155	O08848
RefSeq (mRNA)	NM_001042369; NM_001042370; NM_001173524; NM_001173525; NM_004600 NM_001331020	NM_013835
RefSeq (protein)	NP_001035828; NP_001035829; NP_001166995; NP_001166996; NP_001317949 NP_004591	NP_038863
Location (UCSC)	Chr 1: 193.06 – 193.09 Mb	Chr 1: 143.63 – 143.65 Mb
PubMed search
- Wikidata
View/Edit Human	View/Edit Mouse

RNA-binding protein RO60 is a protein that in humans is encoded by the RO60 gene (previously TROVE2). This protein binds to and regulates various types of RNA molecules like Y RNA and pre-5S ribosomal RNA. This includes problematic RNA like misfolded RNA and inflammation-induced Alu retrotransposon elements.

== See also ==
- Anti-SSA/Ro autoantibodies
