= Epstein–Barr virus nuclear antigen 2 =

Identifiers
- Organism: Epstein-Barr virus (strain B95-8)
- Symbol: EBNA2
- UniProt: P12978
Search for
- Structures: Swiss-model
- Domains: InterPro

The Epstein–Barr virus nuclear antigen 2 (EBNA-2) is one of the six EBV viral nuclear proteins expressed in latently infected B lymphocytes is a transactivator protein. EBNA2 is involved in the regulation of latent viral transcription and contributes to the immortalization of EBV infected cells. EBNA2 acts as an adapter molecule that binds to cellular sequence-specific DNA-binding proteins, JK recombination signal-binding protein (RBP-JK), and PU.1 as well as working with multiple members of the RNA polymerase II transcription complex.

== Structure ==
EBNA2 has an acidic activation domain, which can interact with many different general transcription factors and co-activators. Regulation of transcription initiation and elongation by EBNA 2 is done part through cyclin-dependent kinase 9 (CDK9) dependent phosphorylation of the RNA polymerase C-terminal domain.

== Mechanism ==
EBNA2 requires C-promoter binding factor 1 (CBF1) to aid in binding to its cis-responsive DNA element, the C promoter (Cp). Binding occurs during infection, to generate a 120kb transcript that encodes all nuclear antigens required for immortalization by EBV.2 Mutation of EBNA2 amino acid 323 and 324, which are located within a highly conserved amino acid motif, abolished the interaction with CBF1.3 This same mutation also abolished the ability of EBNA-2 to activate the Cp.

EBNA-LP and EBNA2 are the first two proteins expressed in latent infection of primary B lymphocytes. EBNA-LP stimulates EBNA2 activation of the LMP1 promoter and of the LMP1/LMP2B bidirectional transcriptional regulatory element whereas EBNA-LP alone only has a negative effect.

EBNA2 transactivates the promoters of the latent membrane antigens LMP, TP1 and TP2. Additionally, EBNA2 interacts with an EBNA2 responsive cis-element of the TP1 promoter. Interactions with both the TP1 and LMP/TP2 promoters occur at at least one binding site for the cellular repressor protein RBP-Jκ. EBNA2 is tethered to the EBNA2 responsive promoter elements by interacting with RBP-Jκ, a human recombination signal sequence binding protein.

Specific responsive elements that share the core sequence GTGGGAA have been discovered in several of the promoters activated by EBNA2. A similar core sequence has recently been identified as a binding site in RBP-Jκ. The binding of RBP-Jκ is not sufficient for EBNA2-mediated trans activation. An activated form of the Notch receptor can transactivate a reporter construct containing a hexamer of the two RBP-Jκ binding sites of the TP1 promoter. This supports the idea that EBNA2 acts as a functional equivalent of an activated Notch receptor.

EBNA2 also interacts with the human homolog of the yeast transcription factor (SNF5 hSNF5/Ini1) as it coelutes with both hSNF5/Ini1 and BRG1. BRG1 is a human homolog of SWI/SNF2. However, this interaction is restricted to a subpopulation of phosphorylated viral EBNA2. EBNA2-hSNF5/Ini1 interaction adds credit to the idea that EBNA2 facilitates transcriptional transactivation by acting as a transcription adapter molecule. Possibly, EBNA2 engages the hSNF-SWI complex to generate an open chromatin conformation at the EBNA2-responsive target genes. This then potentiates the function of the RBP-JK-EBNA2-polymerase II transcription complex.
