= Epstein–Barr virus vaccine =

Ongoing medical research

Vaccine description
- Target: Epstein–Barr virus

Identifiers
- ChemSpider: none

As of 2026, a vaccine against Epstein–Barr virus was not yet available. The virus establishes latent infection and causes infectious mononucleosis. There is also increasing evidence that EBV may be a trigger of multiple sclerosis. It is a dual-tropic virus, meaning that it infects two different host cell types — in this case, both B cells and epithelial cells. One challenge is that the Epstein–Barr virus expresses very different proteins during its lytic and its latent phases. Antiviral agents act by inhibiting viral DNA replication, but as of 2016, there was little evidence that they are effective against Epstein–Barr virus. They are also expensive, risk causing resistance to antiviral agents, and (in 1% to 10% of cases) can cause unpleasant side effects.

Several clinical trials for a vaccine were conducted in 2006–2008. The viral proteins Gp350/220 are a primary target, but this would only block infection of B cells, not epithelial cells. A vaccine called MVA-EL has been also proposed as a target for EBV-positive cancers, but this would only be effective in combating EBV-related cancers, not the EBV infection itself. VLP (virus-like particle)-based EBV vaccines are also the subject of intensive research.

In April 2018, the first human antibody that blocks Epstein-Barr Virus was discovered, called AMMO1. It blocks glycoproteins gH and gL. This discovery defines new sites of vulnerability on Epstein-Barr Virus, and neutralizes the dual-tropic infection (stopping both infection of B cells and epithelial cells). It is the most promising discovery to date, as it is the first that may be able to block both B cell infection and epithelial infection.

In 2021, Moderna announced two mRNA vaccine candidates targeting EBV: a prophylactic mRNA-1189 and a therapeutic mRNA-1195. Regarding the mRNA-1189, the company said that the "vaccine encodes five glycoproteins to inhibit both mechanisms for viral entry into B cells (gp350 plus gH/gL/gp42), adds protection for epithelial cells (gH/gL), and includes gB for protection of all cells." The viral proteins produced by the mRNA in this vaccine are expressed in their native form, bound to the cell membrane, where they are available for recognition by the immune system. The company began Phase I clinical trials of mRNA-1189 on 5 January 2022. The other candidate, mRNA-1195 vaccine, is being developed to prevent longer-term complications which may be caused by EBV, and it contains additional antigens compared to mRNA-1189. In early 2023, Moderna began Phase I clinical trials of mRNA-1195. A phase II clinical trial started in 2025 to assess safety and effectiveness in the treatment of MS.
