= Epstein–Barr virus latent membrane protein 2 =

2 viral proteins of the Epstein-Barr virus

Epstein–Barr virus (EBV) latent membrane protein 2 (LMP2) are two viral proteins of the Epstein–Barr virus. LMP2A/LMP2B are transmembrane proteins that act to block tyrosine kinase signaling. LMP2A is a transmembrane protein that inhibits normal B-cell signal transduction by mimicking an activated B-cell receptor (BCR). The N-terminus domain of LMP2A is tyrosine phosphorylated and associates with Src family protein tyrosine kinases (PTKs) as well as spleen tyrosine kinase (Syk). PTKs and Syk are associated with BCR signal transduction.

== LMP2 gene structure and expression ==
Latent Membrane Protein 2 (LMP2) is a rightward transcribing gene. LMP2's transcript originates across the fused terminal repeats in sequences at opposite ends of the genome. 16‍–‍24 hours after infection, the genome circularizes and the open reading frame is created. 1.7 kb and 2.0 kb messages are created by alternative promoter usage and differ only in the sequences of the first exon. These messages are expressed in Epstein-Barr Virus transformed lymphoblastoid cell cultures. The ratio of these messages varies widely and unpredictably suggesting little co-ordinate control of promoter activity or mRNA abundance. Residues 497 (LMP2A) and 378 (LMP2B) are encoded by these two messages. These two iso forms of LMP2 only differ in that LMP2A contains an extra 119 residue N-terminal domain encoded in exon 1. LMP2B's first exon is non coding. Initiation of translation is presumed to occur at the first available [methionine] that is in-frame in exon two. Twelve membrane spanning segments ending with a short 28 residue COOH tail are common to both proteins in residue 379.

== LMP2A protein interactions ==
The 119 amino-terminal cytoplasmic domain of LMP2A has several motifs that mediate interactions between proteins, including eight tyrosine residues. Two motifs that are centered on Y74 and Y85 are spaced 7 residues apart to form an immunoreceptor tyrosine-based activation motif (ITAM) commonly found in Fc receptors and signal molecules of B-cell and T-cell receptors. Receptor docking with molecules containing cytoplasmic tyrosine kinases is governed by Phosphorylation of ITAM motifs. In lymphoblastoid cell cultures, Syk tyrosine kinases have been found in LMP2A immunoprecipitates following in vitro kinase reactions followed by Syk antibody reimunnoprecipitation. Affinity precipitation experiments have shown that Syk interacts with phosphorylated peptides corresponding to the LMP2A-ITAM complex. Residues for Syk binding have been discovered by inducing point mutations in Y74F and Y85F point. Tyrosine kinase LYN has also been detected in immunoprecipitates from transiently transfected B cells at residue Y112. Constitutive phosphorylation occurs on tyrosine, serine and threonine residues.

== LMP2A function ==
Epstein–Barr virus (EBV) establishes a lifelong latent infection in B lymphocytes. Viral LMP2A mRNA is frequently detected in peripheral blood B lymphocytes and the protein is often present in tumor biopsies from EBV malignancies. This suggests LMP2A plays an important role in viral latency, as well as in progression of EBV related diseases such as Burkitt's lymphoma, Nasopharyngeal carcinoma, and Hodgkin's lymphoma. Portis and Longnecker (2004) have found that LMP2A induces activation of B cell Ras pathway in vivo. Using down stream inhibitors of Ras signaling components, they demonstrated activation of PI3K/Akt pathway is involved in LMP2A mediated B cell survival and resistance to apoptosis Caldwell et al. (1998) demonstrated the ability of LMP2A to provide survival signals to B-cells in vivo where expression of an LMP2A transgene in mice disrupts with normal B-cell development. This results in BCR-negative cells being able to exit the bone marrow and survive in peripheral lymphoid organs. B-cells from LMP2A transgenic E line undergo immunoglobulin light chain rearrangements, but not heavy chain rearrangement. This indicates that LMP2A signaling bypasses the requirement for immunoglobulin recombination and allows immunoglobulin M-negative type cells to bypass apoptosis, allowing them to colonize peripheral lymphoid organs.

== LMP2B ==
Eight exons of LMP2 isoforms encode 12 membrane spanning segments that are connected by short hydrophilic loops and ends with a 27 amino acid cytoplasmic C-terminus domain. LMP2B, unlike LMP2A, does not contain the N-terminal 119 amino acid cytoplasmic signaling domain. Most LMP2 research is focused on LMP2A isoform due to its unique expression in latently infected B lymphocytes in situ. LMP2B protein function is unknown. There has not been a comprehensive phenotypic analysis of the LMP2B isoform because of its hydrophobic character. While the role of LMP2B in pathogenesis remains uncertain, homology studies comparing the LMP2 gene of EBV with Rhesus and Baboon Lymphocryptovirus, have revealed promoter regulatory elements, Epstein–Barr nuclear antigen-2 responsiveness, and the ability to make LMP2B transcripts are conserved. This implies that an unrecognized role for LMP2B in the EBV life cycle has yet to be determined.
