= Epstein–Barr virus nuclear antigen 1 =

Epstein Barr virus nuclear antigen-1, DNA-binding domain

Identifiers
- Symbol: EBV-NA1
- Pfam: PF02905
- InterPro: IPR004186
- SCOP2: 1b3t / SCOPe / SUPFAM
Available protein structures:
- Pfam: structures / ECOD
- PDB: RCSB PDB; PDBe; PDBj
- PDBsum: structure summary

Epstein–Barr nuclear antigen 1 (EBNA1) is a multifunctional, dimeric viral protein associated with Epstein–Barr virus (EBV). It is the only EBV protein found in all EBV-related malignancies. It is important in establishing and maintaining the altered state that cells take when infected with EBV. EBNA1 has a glycine–alanine repeat sequence that separates the protein into amino- and carboxy-terminal domains. This sequence also seems to stabilize the protein, preventing proteasomal breakdown, as well as impairing antigen processing and MHC class I-restricted antigen presentation. This thereby inhibits the CD8-restricted cytotoxic T cell response against virus-infected cells. EBNA1 is expressed from the Qp promoter during all latency programs. It is the only viral protein expressed in latency program I.

== Function ==
EBNA1 is integral to many EBV functions including gene regulation, extrachromosomal replication, and maintenance of the EBV episomal genome through positive and negative regulation of viral promoters. Studies show that the phosphorylation of ten specific sites on EBNA1 regulates these functions. When phosphorylation does not occur, replication and transcription activities of the protein are significantly decreased. EBNA1 binds to sequence-specific sites at the origin of viral replication (oriP) within the viral episome. The oriP has four EBNA1 binding sites (called the Dyad Symmetry; DS) where replication is initiated as well as a 20-site repeat segment (called the Family of Repeats; FR). EBNA1's specific binding ability, as well as its ability to tether EBV DNA to chromosomal DNA, allows EBNA1 to mediate replication and partitioning of the episome during division of the host cell. EBNA1 also interacts with some viral promoters via several mechanisms, further contributing to transcriptional regulation of EBNA1 itself as well as the other EBNAs (2 and 3) and of EBV latent membrane protein 1 (LMP1).

== Role in EBV-related malignancies ==
Though EBNA1 is a well-characterized protein, its role in oncogenesis is less well defined. It is consistently expressed in EBV-associated tumors. EBNA1 is the only identified latent protein-encoding genes that it consistently expressed in Burkitt's lymphoma cells and is believed to contribute to EBV malignancies through B cell-directed expression. This expression has the ability to produce B-cell lymphomas in transgenic mice and contribute to the survival of Burkitt's lymphoma in vitro. EBNA1 may regulate cellular genes during EBV's latency phase and thus regulate EBV associated tumors. Some studies suggest that it is possible that EBNA1 may be involved in the maintenance function in tumors. Transgenic mice expressing EBNA1 in B cell lines showed a predisposition for developing B cell lymphoma, thus demonstrating that EBNA1 is a viral oncogene and that it likely plays a role in B cell neoplasia. Data also show that, though its role in extrachromosomal replication, EBNA1 also increases the growth of B cells, thus aiding in the formation of malignancies. Adoptive ex vivo transfer of EBNA-1-specific T cells is a feasible and well-tolerated therapeutic option, however for optimal efficacy expansion protocols should use antigenic sequences from relevant EBV strains.

=== Role in epithelial to mesenchymal transition ===
EBNA1 has been linked to the epithelial to mesenchymal transition (EMT) in nasopharyngeal carcinoma cells. The link has been associated with the TGF-β1/miR-200/ZEB pathway.

== See also ==
- Epstein–Barr virus nuclear-antigen internal ribosomal entry site
