= James Corson Niederman =

American epidemiologist (1924–2024)

- Born: November 27, 1924; Hamilton, Ohio, U.S.
- Died: March 2, 2024 (aged 99); Bethany, Connecticut, U.S.
- Education: Kenyon College, Johns Hopkins School of Medicine
- Known for: Epstein–Barr virus, infectious mononucleosis
- Spouse: Mimi (Miriam) Camp Niederman
- Scientific career
- Fields: Virology, epidemiology
- Workplaces: Yale School of Medicine, Yale School of Public Health

James Corson Niederman (November 27, 1924 – March 2, 2024) was an American epidemiologist whose research identified the Epstein–Barr virus as the cause of infectious mononucleosis in a study published in 1968.

== Early life and education ==
James Corson Niederman was born on November 27, 1924, in Hamilton, Ohio. He graduated from Kenyon College in 1946, and received his medical degree from the Johns Hopkins School of Medicine in 1949. For many years, he was a residential college associate at the Yale School of Public Health.

== Medical research ==
Beginning in the late 1950s, Dr. Niederman and Robert W. McCollum collected sera from Yale University freshmen. Students who tested positive for EBV antibodies never developed infectious mononucleosis (IM). The pre-illness samples of students, who later developed infectious mononucleosis tested negative for EBV antibodies. Therefore, the presence of EBV antibodies indicated immunity from infectious mononucleosis. The study demonstrated that EBV is not simply a passenger virus, it is the etiologic agent of infectious mononucleosis. This was a remarkable discovery, since at the time the cause of IM was a mystery.

== Death ==
Niederman died at his home in Bethany, Connecticut, on March 2, 2024, at the age of 99.

== See also ==
- Epstein–Barr virus
