= 5S ribosomal RNA =

RNA component of the large subunit of the ribosome

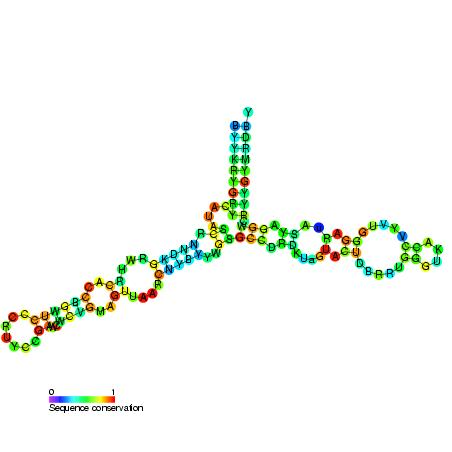
- Predicted secondary structure and sequence conservation of 5S ribosomal RNA

Identifiers
- Symbol: 5S_rRNA
- Rfam: RF00001 CL00113

Other data
- RNA type: Gene; rRNA
- Domain(s): Eukaryota; Bacteria; Archaea
- GO: GO:0005840 GO:0003735
- SO: SO:0000652
- PDB structures: PDBe

The 5S ribosomal RNA (5S rRNA) is an approximately 120 nucleotide-long ribosomal RNA molecule with a mass of 40 kDa. It is a structural and functional component of the large subunit of the ribosome in all domains of life (bacteria, archaea, and eukaryotes), with the exception of mitochondrial ribosomes of fungi and animals. The designation 5S refers to the molecule's sedimentation coefficient in an ultracentrifuge, which is measured in Svedberg units (S).

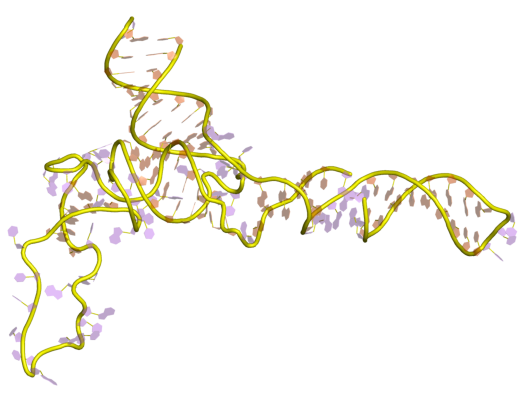
Figure 1: A 3D representation of a 5S rRNA molecule. This structure is of the 5S rRNA from the Escherichia coli 50S ribosomal subunit and is based on a cryo-electron microscopic reconstruction.

== Biosynthesis ==
In prokaryotes, the 5S rRNA gene is typically located in the rRNA operons downstream of the small and the large subunit rRNA, and co-transcribed into a polycistronic precursor. A particularity of eukaryotic nuclear genomes is the occurrence of multiple 5S rRNA gene copies (5S rDNA) clustered in tandem repeats, with copy number varying from species to species. Eukaryotic 5S rRNA is synthesized by RNA polymerase III, whereas other eukaryotic rRNAs are cleaved from a 45S precursor transcribed by RNA polymerase I. In Xenopus oocytes, it has been shown that fingers 4–7 of the nine-zinc finger transcription factor TFIIIA can bind to the central region of 5S RNA. Binding between 5S rRNA and TFIIIA serves to both repress further transcription of the 5S RNA gene and stabilize the 5S RNA transcript until it is required for ribosome assembly.

== Structure ==
The secondary structure of 5S rRNA consists of five helices (denoted I–V in roman numerals), four loops (B-E), and one hinge (A), which form together a Y-like structure. Loops C and D are terminal hairpins and loops B and E are internal. According to phylogenetic studies, helices I and III are likely ancestral. Helix III includes two highly conserved adenosines. Helix V, with its hairpin structure, is thought to interact with TFIIIA.

== Location within the ribosome ==
Figure 2: Atomic 3D structure of the 50S subunit from Haloarcula marismortui, PDB 1FFK. Proteins are shown in blue, 23S rRNA in orange and 5S rRNA in yellow. 5S rRNA together with the ribosomal proteins L5 and L18 and the domain V of 23S rRNA constitute the bulk of the central protuberance (CP).

Using a variety of molecular techniques, including immuno-electron microscopy, cryo-electron microscopy, intermolecular chemical cross-linking, and X-ray crystallography, the location of the 5S rRNA within the large ribosomal subunit has been determined to great precision. In bacteria and archaea, the large ribosomal subunit (LSU) itself is composed of two RNA moieties, the 5S rRNA and another larger RNA known as 23S rRNA, along with numerous associated proteins.

In eukaryotes, the LSU contains 5S, 5.8S, and 28S rRNAs and even more proteins. The structure of LSU in 3-dimensions shows one relatively smooth surface and the opposite surface having three projections, notably the L1 protuberance, the central protuberance (CP), and the L7/L12 stalk. The L1 protuberance and L7/L12 stalk are arranged laterally surrounding CP. The 5S rRNA is located in the CP and participates in formation and structure of this projection. The other major constituents of the central protuberance include the 23S rRNA (or alternatively 28S in eukaryotes) and several proteins including L5, L18, L25, and L27.

== Ribosomal functions ==
The exact function of 5S rRNA is not yet clear. In Escherichia coli, 5S rRNA gene deletions reduce the protein synthesis rate and have a more profound detrimental effect on cell fitness than deletions of a comparable number of copies of other (16S and 23S) rRNA genes. Crystallographic studies indicate that 5S rRNA-binding proteins and other proteins of the central protuberance of the LSU plays a role in binding tRNAs. Also, the topographical and physical proximity between 5S rRNA and 23S rRNA, which forms the peptidyl transferase and GTPase-associating center, suggests that 5S rRNA acts as a mediator between the two functional centers of the ribosome by forming, together with 5S rRNA-binding proteins and other components of the central protuberance, intersubunit bridges and tRNA-binding sites.

== Roles in ribosomal assembly ==
In eukaryotes, the cytosolic ribosome is assembled from four rRNAs and over 80 proteins. Once transcribed, the 3' ends of 5S rRNA can only be trimmed to mature length by functional homologues of RNase T, for example Rex1p in Saccharomyces cerevisiae. The 60S and 40S ribosomal subunits are exported from the nucleus to the cytoplasm where they join to form the mature and translation-competent 80S ribosome. When exactly 5S rRNA is integrated into the ribosome remains controversial, but it is generally accepted that 5S rRNA is incorporated into the 90S particle, which is a precursor to 60S particle, as part of a small ribosome-independent RNP complex formed by 5S rRNA and ribosomal protein L5.

== Interactions with proteins ==
Several important proteins which interact with 5S rRNA are listed below.

=== La protein ===
Interaction of 5S rRNA with the La protein prevents the RNA from degradation by exonucleases in the cell. La protein is found in the nucleus in all eukaryotic organisms and associates with several types of RNAs transcribed by RNA pol III. La protein interacts with these RNAs (including the 5S rRNA) through their 3' oligo-uridine tract, aiding stability and folding of the RNA.

=== L5 protein ===
In eukaryotic cells, ribosomal protein L5 associates and stabilizes the 5S rRNA forming a pre-ribosomal ribonucleoprotein particle (RNP) that is found in both cytosol and the nucleus. L5 deficiency prevents transport of 5S rRNA to the nucleus and results in decreased ribosomal assembly.

=== Other ribosomal proteins ===
In prokaryotes the 5S rRNA binds to the L5, L18 and L25 ribosomal proteins, whereas in eukaryotes 5S rRNA is only known to bind the L5 ribosomal protein. In T. brucei, the causative agent of sleeping sickness, 5S rRNA interacts with two closely related RNA-binding proteins, P34 and P37, whose loss results in a lower global level of 5S rRNA.

== Presence in organelle ribosomes ==
Permuted mitochondrial genome encoded 5S rRNA

Identifiers
- Symbol: mtPerm-5S
- Rfam: RF02547 CL00113

Other data
- RNA type: Gene; rRNA
- Domain: Eukaryota;
- GO: GO:0005840 GO:0003735
- SO: SO:0000652
- PDB structures: PDBe

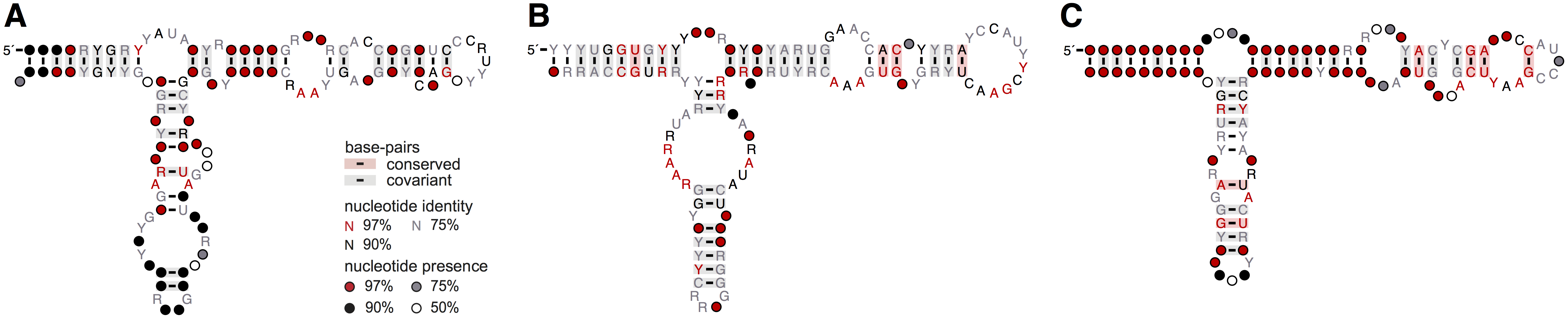
Figure 3: Consensus secondary structure models of 5S rRNA based on the covariance models used to search for 5S rRNA genes. Models for: A) bacteria, archaea, and eukaryotic nuclei, B) plastids, and C) mitochondria. The IUPAC code letters and circles indicate conserved nucleotides and positions with variable nucleotide identity, respectively. Conserved and covariant substitutions in canonical (Watson-Crick) base-pairs are shaded.

Translation machineries of mitochondria and plastids (organelles of endosymbiotic bacterial origin), and their bacterial relatives share many features but also display marked differences. Organelle genomes encode SSU and LSU rRNAs without exception, yet the distribution of 5S rRNA genes (rrn5) is most uneven. Rrn5 is easily identified and common in genomes of most plastids. In contrast, mitochondrial rrn5 initially appeared to be restricted to plants and a small number of protists. Additional, more divergent organellar 5S rRNAs were only identified with specialized covariance models that incorporate information on the pronounced sequence composition bias and structural variation. This analysis pinpointed additional 5S rRNA genes not only in mitochondrial genomes of most protist lineages, but also in genomes of certain apicoplasts (non-photosynthetic plastids of pathogenic protozoa such as Toxoplasma gondii and Eimeria tenella).

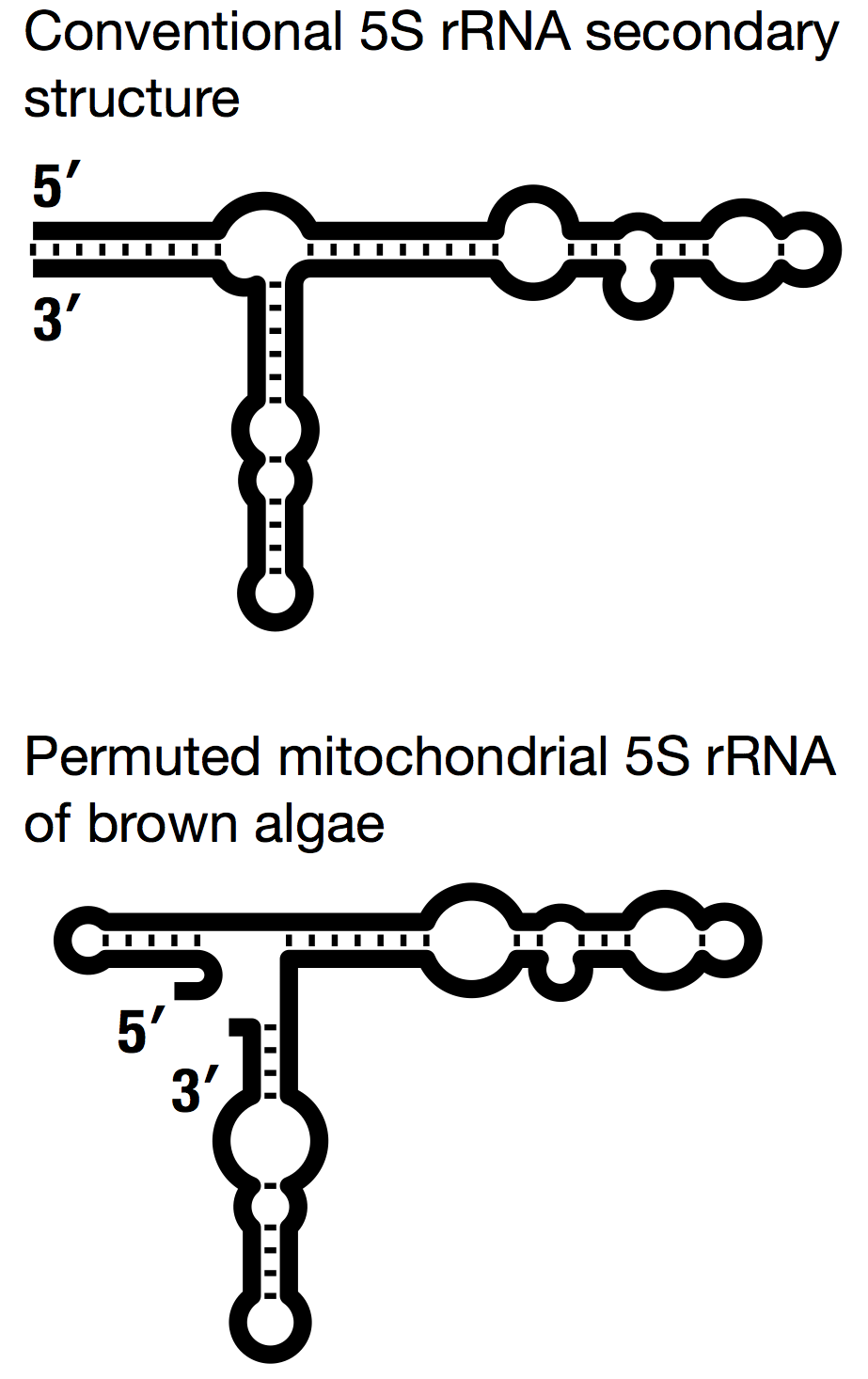
Figure 4: Comparison of the conventional and permuted secondary structure models of 5S rRNA.

Mitochondrial 5S rRNAs of most stramenopiles comprise the largest diversity of secondary structures. The permuted mitochondrial 5S rRNAs in brown algae represent the most unconventional case, where the closing helix I, which otherwise brings together the molecule's 5′ and 3′ ends, is replaced by a (closed) hairpin resulting in an open three-way junction.

Current evidence indicates that mitochondrial DNA of only a few groups, notably animals, fungi, alveolates and euglenozoans lacks the gene. The central protuberance, otherwise occupied by 5S rRNA and its associated proteins (see Figure 2), was remodeled in various ways. In the fungal mitochondrial ribosomes, 5S rRNA is replaced by LSU rRNA expansion sequences. In kinetoplastids (euglenozoans), the central protuberance is made entirely of evolutionarily novel mitochondrial ribosomal proteins. Lastly, animal mitochondrial ribosomes have coopted a specific mitochondrial tRNA (Val in vertebrates) to substitute the missing 5S rRNA.

== See also ==
- 50S
- Ribosome
- Translation (biology)
