= Epstein–Barr virus viral-capsid antigen =

Viral protein

Epstein Barr Virus (EBV) causes the illness referred to as Mononucleosis. In the infectious stage of this illness, individuals will have Epstein Barr viral capsid antigens (EBV-VCA) in their mouth and blood. The viral capsid of a virus is the complex of proteins that surrounds the genetic material inside the virus. Epstein Barr virus capsid antigens (VCA) are any sections of the viral capsid that the hosts' antibodies bind to. The hosts, or individuals infected with the virus, will produce antibodies to target these Epstein Barr viral capsid antigens. IgM VCA antibodies will be produced during the early stage of the EBV infection. In contrast, IgG VCA antibodies will be produced at later stages on the infection.

== The Viral Capsid Antigen (VCA) ==
The Virus Capsid Antigen (VCA) is a structural protein component of the Epstein-Barr Virus (EBV) that forms part of the viral capsid, the protective shell that encloses the EBV’s genetic material. The VCA is expressed within cells late in the lytic cycle, a phase of EBV infection where the virus actively replicates and produces new virus particles. VCA expression occurs within infected B lymphocytes and epithelial cells as the virus transitions from latency to lytic reactivation. Because it appears late in replication, detection of antibodies to VCA provides insight into the timing and stage of EBV infection.

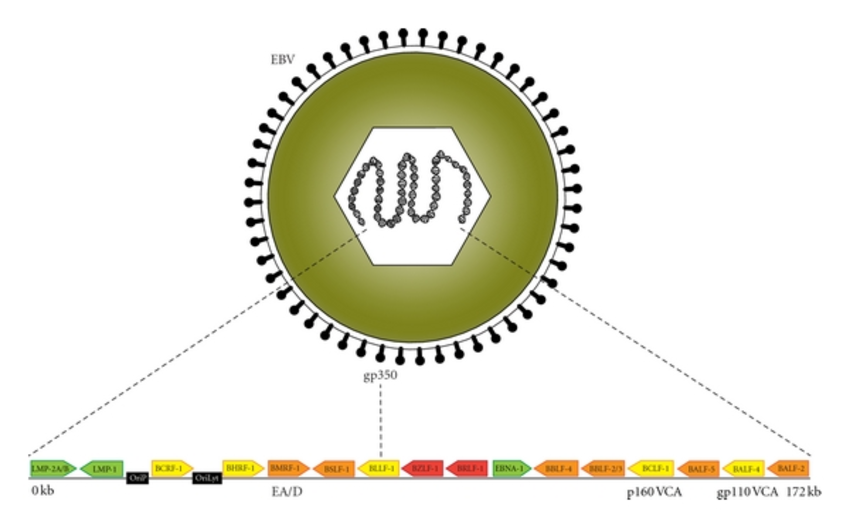
EBV structure and partial map of the genome. During the lytic cycle, various lytic antigens are expressed (shown in yellow). Gene products of BMRF-1, BCLF-1, and BALF-4 are depicted as EA/D, p160 VCA, and gp110 VCA, respectively.

The VCA serves as a key antigen associated with the EBV that is targeted by IgM antibodies during acute infection, while IgG antibodies develop slightly later and persist for life, serving as markers of past infection and lasting immunity.

=== Types of Antigens Associated with EBV ===
Laboratory testing can distinguish several types of antigens:

1. Viral Capsid Antigen (VCA): Produced during the early stages of infection and is present in the virus particles.
2. Nuclear Antigen (EBNA): Produced during the latent phase of infection and remains in infected cells.
3. Early Antigen (EA): Produced during the initial stages of infection and helps the virus replicate.
4. Membrane Antigen (LMP): Produced during the latent phase and plays a role in maintaining the virus in the body.

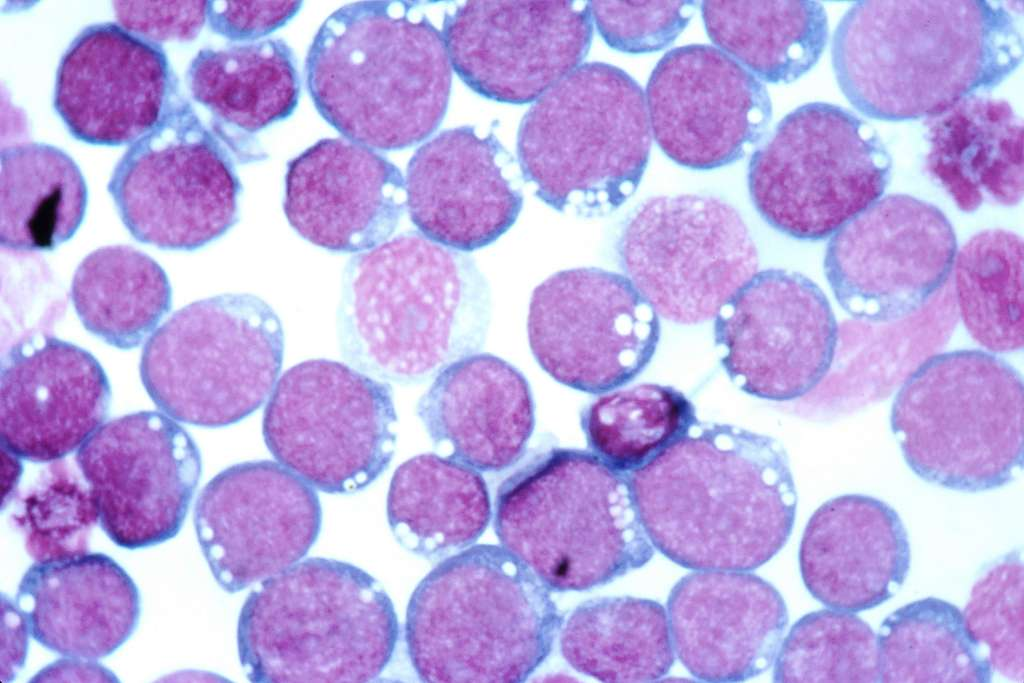
Epstein-Barr virus (EBV) stained with Hematoxylin and eosin (HE).

== Use of the Viral Capsid Antigen in Diagnosis of Epstein-Barr Virus (EBV) ==
The VCA is targeted by specific antibodies that are commonly used to detect prior EBV infection. High levels of anti-VCA IgG antibodies indicate a past or current EBV infection, as they persist for the rest of a person's life, while anti-VCA IgM antibodies indicate a more recent or acute infection, as they usually disappear within a few weeks to months. VCA-IgG is detectable even in asymptomatic individuals in order to determine whether they are susceptible to, or have previously had, an infection by EBV.

Detection of antibodies to the VCA is a cornerstone of serological testing for EBV. Different antibody classes provide diagnostic clues about the stage of infection:

- VCA-IgM positive and EBNA negative is typical of an acute primary infection, while VCA-IgG positive / EBNA positive and VCA-IgM negative is consistent with past infection or immunity.

Antibody Classes and Detection
Antibody	Appearance	Diagnostic Meaning
Anti-VCA IgM	Early in infection during the acute phase	Indicates recent or current infection; disappears within weeks to months.
Anti-VCA IgG	Slightly later in infection; persists for life	Indicates past or ongoing infection.
Anti-EBNA IgG	Appears several months post-infection	Confirms past infection; absent in acute cases.
Anti-EA IgG	Variable; may indicate reactivation	May suggest viral reactivation or chronic infection.

== Clinical Relevance and Limitations ==
During early infection of EBV, IgG antibodies to VCA may be present, but the antibodies persist indefinitely. Therefore, testing for antibodies cannot distinguish between a remote past infection and a resolved infection without analyzing additional markers (like EBNA or EA).

In immunocompromised patients, antibody production may be atypical or delayed, so serology should be interpreted alongside clinical presentation and, when necessary, molecular testing (PCR).
