= La domain =

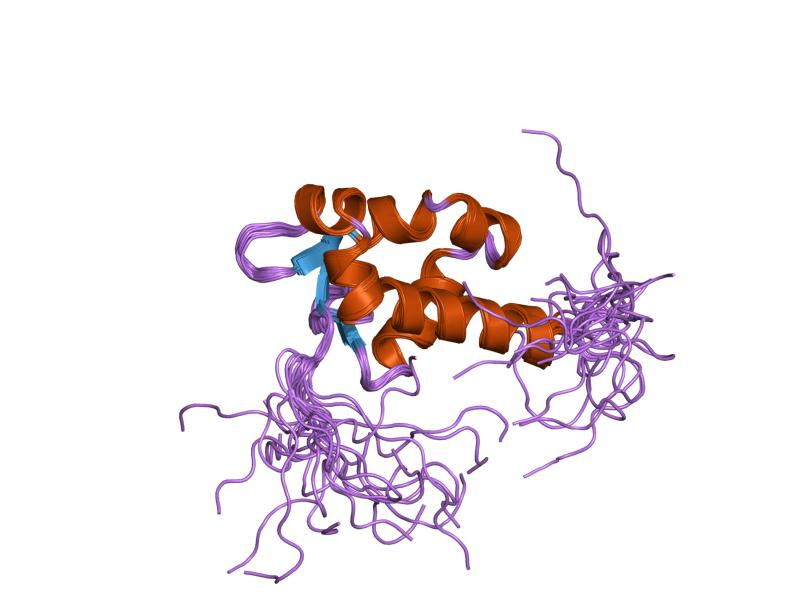
- solution structure of the la domain of c-mpl binding protein

Identifiers
- Symbol: La
- Pfam: PF05383
- InterPro: IPR006630
- SMART: TSPN
- PROSITE: PDOC00280
- MEROPS: I75
- SCOP2: 2mpr / SCOPe / SUPFAM
- TCDB: 1.B.3
- CDD: cd07323
Available protein structures:
- PDB: IPR006630 PF05383 (ECOD; PDBsum)
- AlphaFold: IPR006630; PF05383

In molecular biology, the La domain is a conserved protein domain. Human 60 kDa SS-A/Ro ribonucleoproteins (RNPs) are composed of one of the four small Y RNAs and at least two proteins, Ro60 and La. The La protein is a 47 kDa polypeptide that frequently acts as an autoantigen in systemic lupus erythematosus and Sjögren syndrome. In the nucleus, La acts as a RNA polymerase III (RNAP III) transcription factor, while in the cytoplasm, La acts as a translation factor. In the nucleus, La binds to the 3'UTR of nascent RNAP III transcripts to assist in folding and maturation. In the cytoplasm, La recognises specific classes of mRNAs that contain a 5'-terminal oligopyrimidine (5'TOP) motif known to control protein synthesis. The specific recognition is mediated by the N-terminal domain of La, which comprises a La motif and an RNA recognition motif (RRM). The La motif adopts an alpha/beta fold that comprises a winged-helix motif.

Homologous La domain-containing proteins have been identified in a wide range of organisms except Archaea, bacteria and viruses.
