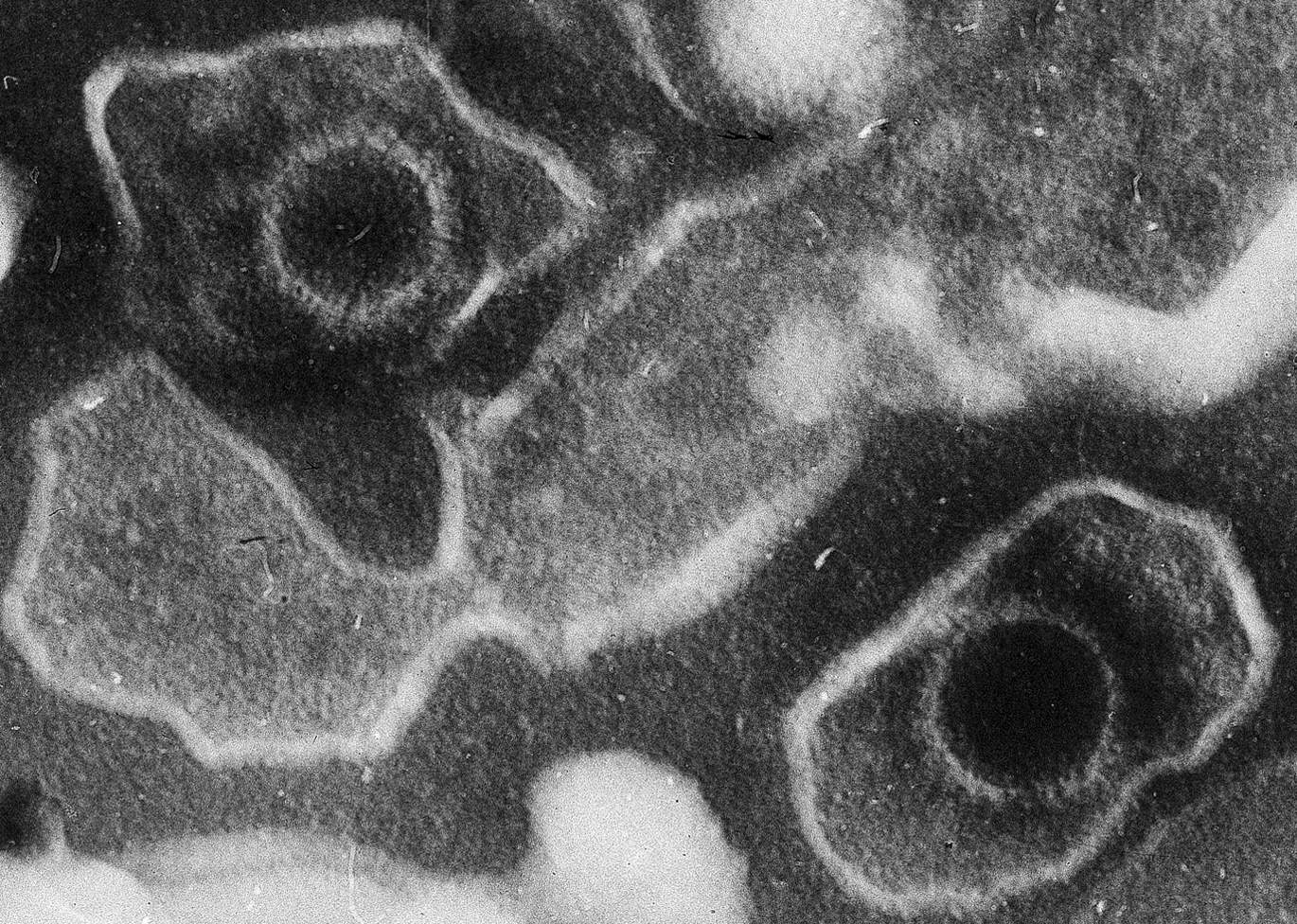
- Electron micrograph of two Epstein–Barr virions (viral particles) showing round capsids loosely surrounded by the membrane envelope

Virus classification
- (unranked): Virus
- Realm: Duplodnaviria
- Kingdom: Heunggongvirae
- Phylum: Peploviricota
- Class: Herviviricetes
- Order: Herpesvirales
- Family: Orthoherpesviridae
- Genus: Lymphocryptovirus
- Species: Lymphocryptovirus humangamma4

Synonyms
- Epstein–Barr virus; Human gammaherpesvirus 4; Human herpesvirus 4; HHV-4; EBV

= Epstein–Barr virus =

Virus of the herpes family

The Epstein–Barr virus (EBV; /ˈɛpstaɪn/ EP-styne, Yiddish: [ˈɛpʃtejn]), also known as human herpesvirus 4 (HHV-4), is one of the nine known human herpesvirus types in the herpes family, and is one of the most common viruses in humans. EBV is a double-stranded DNA virus. EBV is the first identified oncogenic virus, a virus that can cause cancer. EBV establishes a permanent infection in human B cells. It is the most common cause (90% of cases) of infectious mononucleosis and is also tightly linked to many malignant diseases (cancers and autoimmune diseases). Various vaccine formulations have been tested in humans and other animals; however, none of them were able to prevent EBV infection, and no vaccine has been approved to date.

Infectious mononucleosis ("mono" or "glandular fever"), is characterized by extreme fatigue, fever, sore throat, and swollen lymph nodes. EBV is also associated with various non-malignant, premalignant, and malignant EBV-associated lymphoproliferative diseases such as Burkitt lymphoma, hemophagocytic lymphohistiocytosis, and Hodgkin's lymphoma; non-lymphoid malignancies such as gastric cancer and nasopharyngeal carcinoma; and conditions associated with human immunodeficiency virus such as hairy leukoplakia and central nervous system lymphomas. The virus is also associated with the childhood disorders of Alice in Wonderland syndrome and acute cerebellar ataxia and, by some evidence, higher risks of developing certain autoimmune diseases, especially dermatomyositis, systemic lupus erythematosus, rheumatoid arthritis, and Sjögren's syndrome. About 200,000 cancer cases globally per year are thought to be attributable to EBV. In January 2022, a large study following 10 million active US military over 20 years suggested EBV as the leading cause of multiple sclerosis (MS), with a recent EBV infection causing a 32-fold increase in MS risk development.

Infection with EBV occurs by the oral transfer of saliva and genital secretions. Most people become infected with EBV and gain adaptive immunity. In the United States, about half of all five-year-old children and about 90% of adults have evidence of previous infection. Infants become susceptible to EBV as soon as maternal antibody protection disappears. Most children who become infected with EBV display no symptoms, or the symptoms are indistinguishable from other mild, brief illnesses of childhood. When infection occurs during adolescence or young adulthood, it causes infectious mononucleosis 35 to 50% of the time.

EBV infects B cells of the immune system and epithelial cells, and may infect T cells, NK cells, and histiocytic-dendritic cells. Once EBV's initial lytic infection is brought under control, EBV latency persists in the individual's memory B cells for the rest of their life.

== Virology ==
Simplified diagram of the structure of EBV

=== Structure and genome ===
The virus is about 122–180 nm in diameter and is composed of a double helix of deoxyribonucleic acid (DNA) which contains about 172,000 base pairs encoding 85 genes. The DNA is surrounded by a protein nucleocapsid, which is surrounded by a tegument made of protein, which in turn is surrounded by an envelope containing both lipids and surface projections of glycoproteins, which are essential to infection of the host cell. In July 2020, a team of researchers reported the first complete atomic model of the nucleocapsid of the virus. This "first complete atomic model [includes] the icosahedral capsid, the capsid-associated tegument complex (CATC) and the dodecameric portal—the viral genome translocation apparatus."

=== Tropism ===
The term viral tropism refers to which cell types that EBV infects. EBV can infect different cell types, including B cells and epithelial cells.

The viral three-part glycoprotein complexes of gHgL gp42 mediate B cell membrane fusion; although the two-part complexes of gHgL mediate epithelial cell membrane fusion. EBVs that are made in the B cells have low numbers of gHgLgp42 complexes, because these three-part complexes interact with Human-leukocyte-antigen class II molecules present in B cells in the endoplasmic reticulum and are degraded. In contrast, EBV from epithelial cells are rich in the three-part complexes because these cells do not normally contain HLA class II molecules. As a consequence, EBV made from B cells are more infectious to epithelial cells, and EBV made from epithelial cells is more infectious to B cells. Viruses lacking the gp42 portion can bind to human B cells, but are unable to infect.

=== Replication cycle ===
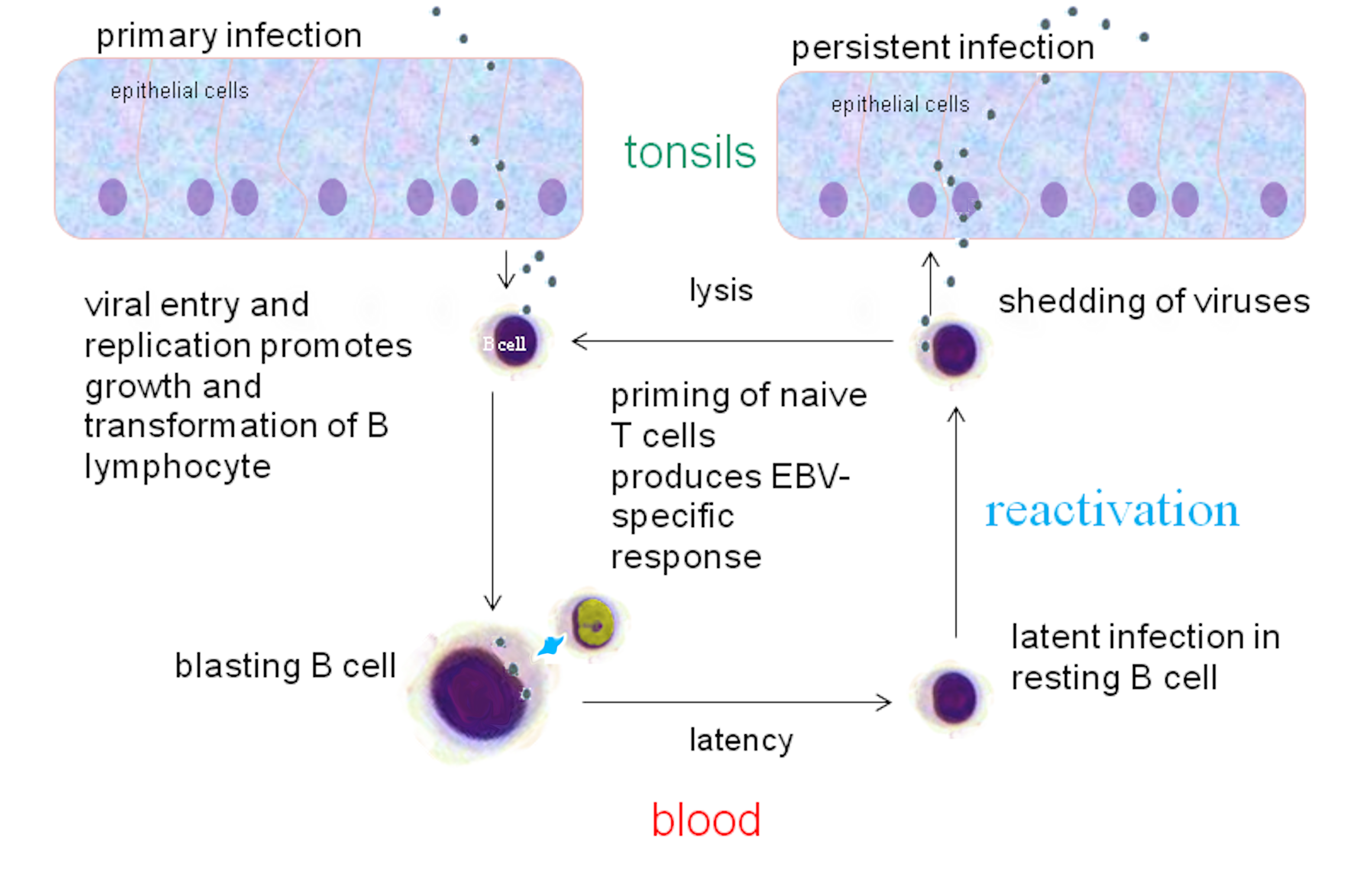
The EBV replication cycle

==== Entry to the cell ====
EBV can infect both B cells and epithelial cells. The mechanisms for entering these two cells are different.

To enter B cells, viral glycoprotein gp350 binds to cellular receptor CD21 (also known as CR2). Then, viral glycoprotein gp42 interacts with cellular MHC class II molecules. This triggers fusion of the viral envelope with the cell membrane, allowing EBV to enter the B cell. Human CD35, also known as complement receptor 1 (CR1), is an additional attachment factor for gp350 / 220, and can provide a route for entry of EBV into CD21-negative cells, including immature B-cells. EBV infection downregulates the expression of CD35.

To enter epithelial cells, viral protein BMRF-2 interacts with cellular β1 integrins. Then, viral protein gH/gL interacts with cellular αvβ6/αvβ8 integrins. This triggers fusion of the viral envelope with the epithelial cell membrane, allowing EBV to enter the epithelial cell. Unlike B-cell entry, epithelial-cell entry is impeded by viral glycoprotein gp42.

Once EBV enters the cell, the viral capsid dissolves and the viral genome is transported to the cell nucleus.

==== Lytic replication ====
The lytic cycle, or productive infection, results in the production of infectious virions. EBV can undergo lytic replication in both B cells and epithelial cells. In B cells, lytic replication normally only takes place after reactivation from latency. In epithelial cells, lytic replication often directly follows viral entry.

For lytic replication to occur, the viral genome must be linear. The latent EBV genome is circular, so it must linearize in the process of lytic reactivation. During lytic replication, viral DNA polymerase is responsible for copying the viral genome. This contrasts with latency, in which host-cell DNA polymerase copies the viral genome.

Lytic gene products are produced in three consecutive stages: immediate-early, early, and late. Immediate-early lytic gene products act as transactivators, enhancing the expression of later lytic genes. Immediate-early lytic gene products include BZLF1 (also known as Zta, EB1, associated with its product gene ZEBRA) and BRLF1 (associated with its product gene Rta). Early lytic gene products have many more functions, such as replication, metabolism, and blockade of antigen processing. Early lytic gene products include BNLF2. Finally, late lytic gene products tend to be proteins with structural roles, such as VCA, which forms the viral capsid. Other late lytic gene products, such as BCRF1, help EBV evade the immune system.

EGCG, a polyphenol in green tea, has shown in a study to inhibit EBV spontaneous lytic infection at the DNA, gene transcription, and protein levels in a time- and dose-dependent manner; the expression of EBV lytic genes Zta, Rta, and early antigen complex EA-D (induced by Rta), however, the highly stable EBNA-1 gene found across all stages of EBV infection is unaffected. Specific inhibitors (to the pathways) suggest that Ras/MEK/MAPK pathway contributes to EBV lytic infection though BZLF1 and PI3-K pathway through BRLF1, the latter completely abrogating the ability of a BRLF1 adenovirus vector to induce the lytic form of EBV infection. Additionally, the activation of some genes but not others is being studied to determine just how to induce immune destruction of latently infected B cells by use of either TPA or sodium butyrate.

==== Latency ====
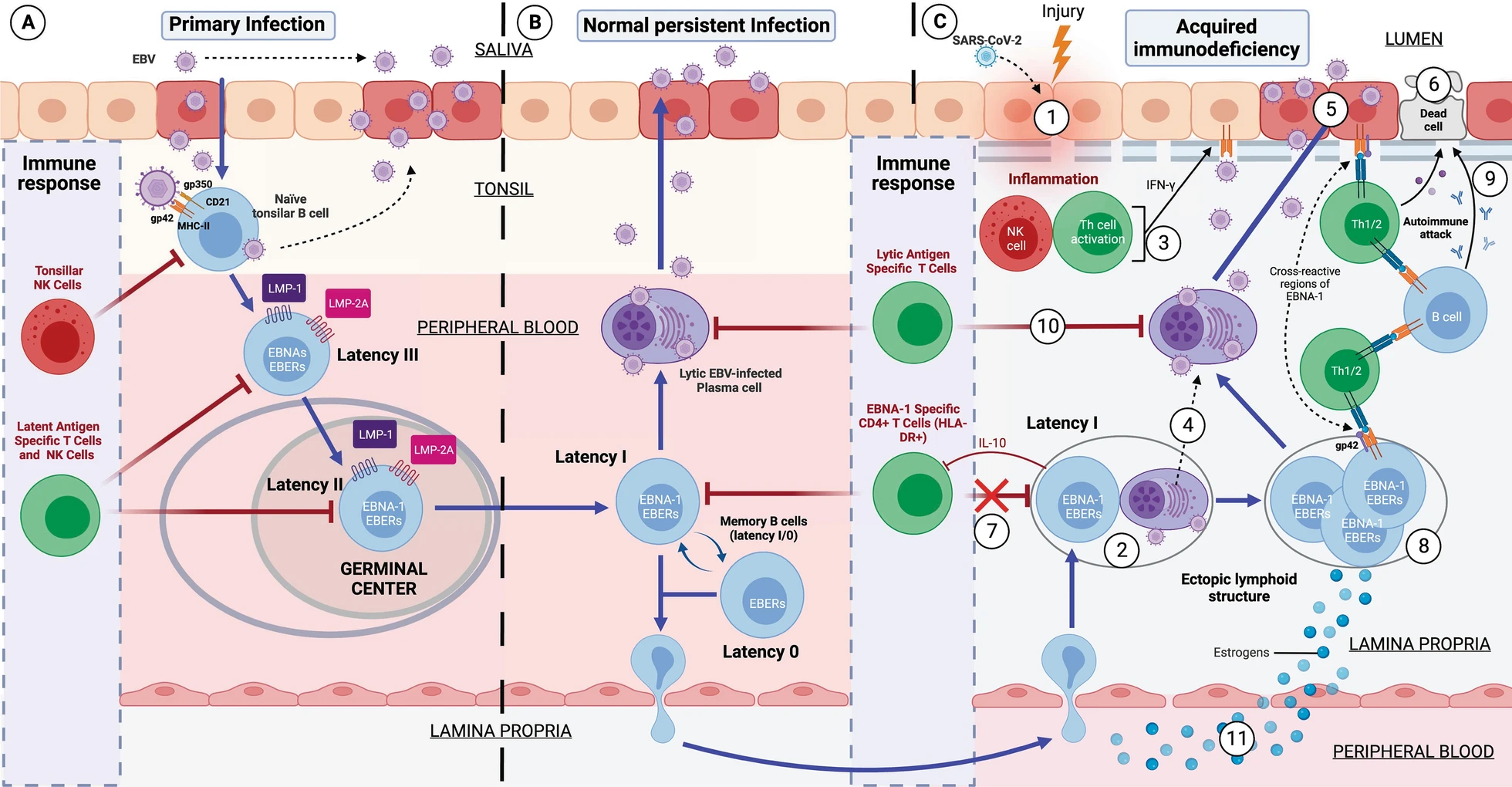
Development of Epstein–Barr Virus (EBV)-induced acquired immunodeficiency in patients with genetic susceptibility.

Unlike lytic replication, latency does not result in production of virions. Instead, the EBV genome circular DNA resides in the cell nucleus as an episome and is copied by host-cell DNA polymerase. It persists in the individual's memory B cells. Epigenetic changes such as DNA methylation and cellular chromatin constituents suppress the majority of the viral genes in latently infected cells. Only a portion of EBV's genes are expressed, which support the latent state of the virus. Latent EBV expresses its genes in one of three patterns, known as latency programs. EBV can latently persist within B cells and epithelial cells, but different latency programs are possible in the two types of cells. Beyond restricted gene expression, episomal EBV can physically hook onto host chromatin, reorganize 3D genome compartments, and rewire enhancer landscapes.

EBV can exhibit one of three latency programs: Latency I, Latency II, or Latency III. Each latency program leads to the production of a limited, distinct set of viral proteins and viral RNAs.

Gene Expressed	EBNA-1	EBNA-2	EBNA-3A	EBNA-3B	EBNA-3C	EBNA-LP	LMP1	LMP-2A	LMP-2B	EBER
Product	Protein	Protein	Protein	Protein	Protein	Protein	Protein	Protein	Protein	ncRNAs
Latency I	+	–	–	–	–	–	–	–	–	+
Latency II	+	–	–	–	–	+	+	+	+	+
Latency III	+	+	+	+	+	+	+	+	+	+

Also, a program is postulated in which all viral protein expression is shut off (Latency 0).

Within B cells, all three latency programs are possible. EBV latency within B cells usually progresses from Latency III to Latency II to Latency I. Each stage of latency uniquely influences B cell behavior. Upon infecting a resting naïve B cell, EBV enters Latency III. The set of proteins and RNAs produced in Latency III transforms the B cell into a proliferating blast (also known as B cell activation). Later, the virus restricts its gene expression and enters Latency II. The more limited set of proteins and RNAs produced in Latency II induces the B cell to differentiate into a memory B cell. Finally, EBV restricts gene expression even further and enters Latency I. Expression of EBNA-1 allows the EBV genome to replicate when the memory B cell divides.

Within epithelial cells, only Latency II is possible.

In primary infection, EBV replicates in oropharyngeal epithelial cells and establishes Latency III, II, and I infections in B lymphocytes. EBV latent infection of B lymphocytes is necessary for virus persistence, subsequent replication in epithelial cells, and release of infectious virus into saliva. EBV Latency III and II infections of B lymphocytes, Latency II infection of oral epithelial cells, and Latency II infection of NK- or T-cells can result in malignancies, marked by uniform EBV genome presence and gene expression.

==== Reactivation ====
Latent EBV in B cells can be reactivated to switch to lytic replication. This is known to happen in vivo, but what triggers it is not known precisely. In vitro, latent EBV in B cells can be reactivated by stimulating the B cell receptor, so it is likely reactivation in vivo takes place after latently infected B cells respond to unrelated infections.

Reactivation has been proven to be induced by glucocorticoids (GC's), thus stress reactivates EBV is the next logical conclusion. The leading theory is that the EBV genome has a GC-receptor, which activates active replication.

=== Transformation of B lymphocytes ===
EBV infection of B lymphocytes leads to "immortalization" of these cells, meaning that the virus causes them to continue dividing indefinitely. Normally, cells have a limited lifespan and eventually die, but when EBV infects B lymphocytes, it alters their behavior, making them "immortal" in the sense that they can keep dividing and surviving much longer than usual. This allows the virus to persist in the body for the individual's lifetime.

When EBV infects B cells in vitro, lymphoblastoid cell lines eventually emerge that are capable of indefinite growth. The growth transformation of these cell lines is the consequence of viral protein expression.

EBNA-2, EBNA-3C, and LMP-1 are essential for transformation, whereas EBNA-LP and the EBERs are not.

Following a natural infection with EBV, the virus is thought to execute some or all of its repertoire of gene expression programs to establish a persistent infection. Given the initial absence of host immunity, the lytic cycle produces large numbers of virions to infect other (presumably) B-lymphocytes within the host.

The latent programs reprogram and subvert infected B-lymphocytes to proliferate and bring infected cells to the sites at which the virus presumably persists. Eventually, when host immunity develops, the virus persists by turning off most (or possibly all) of its genes and only occasionally reactivates and produces progeny virions. A balance is eventually struck between occasional viral reactivation and host immune surveillance, removing cells that activate viral gene expression. The manipulation of the human body's epigenetics by EBV can alter the genome of the cell to leave oncogenic phenotypes. As a result, the modification by the EBV increases the host's likelihood of developing EBV-related cancer. EBV-related cancers are unique in that they are frequent in making epigenetic changes but are less likely to mutate.

The site of persistence of EBV may be bone marrow. EBV-positive patients who have had their bone marrow replaced with bone marrow from an EBV-negative donor are found to be EBV-negative after transplantation.

=== Latent antigens ===
All EBV nuclear proteins are produced by alternative splicing of a transcript starting at either the Cp or Wp promoters at the left end of the genome (in the conventional nomenclature). The genes are ordered EBNA-LP/EBNA-2/EBNA-3A/EBNA-3B/EBNA-3C/EBNA-1 within the genome.

The initiation codon of the EBNA-LP coding region is created by an alternate splice of the nuclear protein transcript. In the absence of this initiation codon, EBNA-2/EBNA-3A/EBNA-3B/EBNA-3C/EBNA-1 will be expressed depending on which of these genes is alternatively spliced into the transcript.

=== Protein/genes ===
Protein/gene/antigen	Stage	Description
EBNA-1	latent+lytic	EBNA-1 protein binds to a replication origin (oriP) within the viral genome and mediates replication and partitioning of the episome during division of the host cell. It is the only viral protein expressed during group I latency.
EBNA-2	latent+lytic	EBNA-2 is the main viral transactivator.
EBNA-3	latent+lytic	These genes also bind the host RBP-Jκ protein.
LMP-1	latent	LMP-1 is a six-span transmembrane protein that is also essential for EBV-mediated growth transformation.
LMP-2	latent	LMP-2A/LMP-2B are transmembrane proteins that act to block tyrosine kinase signaling.
EBER	latent	EBER-1/EBER-2 are small nuclear RNAs, which bind to certain nucleoprotein particles, enabling binding to PKR (dsRNA-dependent serin/threonin protein kinase), thus inhibiting its function. EBERs are by far the most abundant EBV products transcribed in EBV-infected cells. They are commonly used as targets for the detection of EBV in histological tissues. ER-particles also induce the production of IL-10, which enhances growth and inhibits cytotoxic T cells.
v-snoRNA1	latent	Epstein–Barr virus snoRNA1 is a box CD-snoRNA generated by the virus during latency. V-snoRNA1 may act as a miRNA-like precursor that is processed into 24 nucleotide sized RNA fragments that target the 3'UTR of viral DNA polymerase mRNA.
ebv-sisRNA	latent	Ebv-sisRNA-1 is a stable intronic sequence RNA generated during latency program III. After the EBERs, it is the third-most abundant small RNA produced by the virus during this program.
miRNAs	latent	EBV microRNAs are encoded by two transcripts, one set in the BART gene and one set near the BHRF1 cluster. The three BHRF1 pri-miRNAS (generating four miRNAs) are expressed during type III latency, whereas the large cluster of BART miRNAs (up to 20 miRNAs) is expressed highly during type II latency and only modestly during type I and II latency. The previous reference also gives an account of the known functions of these miRNAs.
EBV-EA	lytic	Early antigen
EBV-MA	lytic	Membrane antigen
EBV-VCA	lytic	Viral capsid antigen
EBV-AN	lytic	Alkaline nuclease

=== Subtypes of EBV ===
EBV can be divided into two major types, EBV type 1 and EBV type 2. These two subtypes have different EBNA-3 genes. As a result, the two subtypes differ in their transforming capabilities and reactivation ability. Type 1 is dominant throughout most of the world, but the two types are equally prevalent in Africa. One can distinguish EBV type 1 from EBV type 2 by cutting the viral genome with a restriction enzyme and comparing the resulting digestion patterns by gel electrophoresis.

== Detection ==
Interpretation of specific EBV antibodies
Typical interpretation	VCA-IgG	VCA-IgM	EA	EBNA
Never infected	–	–	–	–
Acute infection (IM)	+	+	+/−	–
Acute or recent infection	+	+/−	+	+/−
Recent past infection	+	–	+/−	+
Distant past infection	+	–	–	+
Chronic infection/reactivation	+	–	+	+/−

Serological testing is the first-line approach, employing enzyme-linked immunosorbent assays (ELISA) to detect IgM and IgG antibodies against viral capsid antigen (VCA), early antigen (EA), and Epstein–Barr nuclear antigen (EBNA); the pattern of these antibodies differentiates acute, recent, or past infection stages.

Then in situ hybridization using EBER-ISH targets the highly abundant EBV-encoded small RNAs within infected cells, enabling precise localization of latent infection in tissue biopsies and serving as the diagnostic gold standard in pathology.

Then, nucleic acid detection via polymerase chain reaction (PCR) assays allows rapid, sensitive detection of EBV DNA in blood or tissue, although it cannot distinguish latent from active infection and shows poor correlation with clinical symptoms.

Additional methods such as immunofluorescence assays (IFA) offer high specificity and staging capability in specialized laboratories, and chemiluminescence immunoassays (CLIA) show promise in distinguishing primary from past infections pending further validation.

== Role in disease ==
See also Infectious mononucleosis, diseases associated with EBV infection and the other diseases listed in this section

EBV causes infectious mononucleosis. Children infected with EBV have few symptoms or can appear asymptomatic, but when infection is delayed to adolescence or adulthood, it can cause fatigue, fever, inflamed throat, swollen lymph nodes in the neck, enlarged spleen, swollen liver, or rash. Post-infectious myalgic encephalomyelitis/chronic fatigue syndrome has also been associated with EBV infection.

EBV has also been implicated in several other diseases, including Burkitt's lymphoma, hemophagocytic lymphohistiocytosis, Hodgkin's lymphoma, stomach cancer, nasopharyngeal carcinoma, multiple sclerosis, and lymphomatoid granulomatosis.

Additional diseases that have been linked to EBV include Gianotti–Crosti syndrome, erythema multiforme, acute genital ulcers, and oral hairy leukoplakia. The viral infection is also associated with, and often contributes to the development of, a wide range of non-malignant lymphoproliferative diseases such as severe hypersensitivity mosquito bite allergy reactions, Epstein–Barr virus-positive mucocutaneous ulcers, and hydroa vacciniforme as well as malignant lymphoproliferative diseases such as Epstein–Barr virus-positive Burkitt lymphoma, Epstein–Barr virus-positive Hodgkin lymphoma, and primary effusion lymphoma.

The Epstein–Barr virus has been implicated in disorders related to alpha-synuclein aggregation (e.g., Parkinson's disease, dementia with Lewy bodies, and multiple system atrophy).

=== Multiple sclerosis ===
EBV-infected B cells have been shown to reside within the brain lesions of multiple sclerosis patients, and a 2022 study of 10 million soldiers' historical blood samples showed that "Individuals who were not infected with the Epstein–Barr virus virtually never get multiple sclerosis. It's only after Epstein–Barr virus infection that the risk of multiple sclerosis jumps up by over 30-fold", and that only EBV of many infections had such a clear connection with the disease.

=== Chromosomal breakage and cancer ===
It has been found that EBNA1 may induce chromosomal breakage in the 11th chromosome, specifically in the 11q23 region between the FAM55D gene and FAM55B, which EBNA-1 appears to have a high affinity for due to its DNA-binding domain having an interest in a specific palindromic repeat in this section of the genome. While the cause and exact mechanism for this is unknown, the byproduct results in errors and breakage of the chromosomal structure as cells stemming from the line of the tainted genome undergo mitosis. Since genes in this area have been implicated in leukemia and is home to a tumor suppressor gene that is modified or not present in most tumor gene expression, it's been hypothesized that breakage in this area is the main culprit behind the cancers that EBV increases the chance of. The breakage is also dose-dependent; a person with a latent infection will have less breakage than a person with a novel or reactivated infection, since EBNA1 levels in the nucleus and nucleolus are higher during active attack of the body because of the constant replication and takeover of cells in the body.

The complexities of Epstein–Barr virus (EBV) persistence and its integration into host genomes have been explored. Research involving tissue samples from individuals with various conditions revealed that viral sequences were highly conserved, indicating long-term persistence from dominant strains. Notably, EBV was found to integrate into the host genome in cases of malignancies, including mantle cell lymphoma, where a significant integration event was observed involving the EBV LMP-1 gene and chromosome 17. This integration likely occurred via microhomology-mediated end joining, suggesting a potential mechanism through which EBV may influence tumorigenesis. Moreover, instances of high viral loads and accompanying genetic diversity were noted in patients with active disease, underscoring the virus's dynamic nature within the host and its possible contribution to the progression of EBV-associated cancers.

=== Host control of persistent infection ===
Several environmental factors associate with increased EBV viral load in blood, including HIV positivity and smoking.

Besides environmental factors, the genetic composition of the infected human affects EBV viral load in blood. This includes variants at 28 loci, where the strongest effect is mediated by variants at the Major Histocompatibility Complex (MHC), which harbours the Human Leukocyte Antigens (HLA) genes. The other 27 loci contribute to viral load as well and these are often located at genes that have known functions within the immune system, such as the CTLA4 or ERAP2 genes.

== History ==
The Epstein–Barr virus was named after M. A. Epstein and Yvonne Barr, who discovered the virus together with Bert Achong. In 1961, Epstein, a pathologist and expert electron microscopist, attended a lecture on "The commonest children's cancer in tropical Africa—a hitherto unrecognised syndrome" by D. P. Burkitt, a surgeon practicing in Uganda, in which Burkitt described the "endemic variant" (pediatric form) of what is now called Burkitt's lymphoma. In 1963, a specimen was sent from Uganda to Middlesex Hospital to be cultured. Virus particles were identified in the cultured cells, and the results were published in The Lancet in 1964 by Epstein, Achong, and Barr. Cell lines were sent to Werner and Gertrude Henle at the Children's Hospital of Philadelphia who developed serological markers. In 1967, a technician in their laboratory developed mononucleosis, and they were able to compare a stored serum sample, showing that antibodies to the virus developed. In 1968, they discovered that EBV can directly immortalize B cells after infection, mimicking some forms of EBV-related infections, and confirmed the link between the virus and infectious mononucleosis.

== Research ==
As a relatively complex virus, EBV is not yet fully understood. Laboratories around the world continue to study the virus and develop new ways to treat the diseases it causes. One popular way of studying EBV in vitro is to use bacterial artificial chromosomes. Epstein–Barr virus can be maintained and manipulated in the laboratory in continual latency (a property shared with Kaposi's sarcoma-associated herpesvirus, another of the eight human herpesviruses). Although many viruses are assumed to have this property during infection of their natural hosts, there is no easily managed system for studying this part of the viral lifecycle. Genomic studies of EBV have been able to explore lytic reactivation and regulation of the latent viral episome.

Although under active research, an Epstein–Barr virus vaccine is not yet available. The development of an effective vaccine could prevent up to 200,000 cancers globally per year. The absence of effective animal models is an obstacle to the development of prophylactic and therapeutic vaccines against EBV.

It is possible, in theory, that a prolonged use of valaciclovir, an antiviral drug approved to treat herpes simplex or herpes zoster, might lead to Epstein–Barr eradication, but such a theory was not confirmed by any study. Antiviral agents act by inhibiting viral DNA replication, but there is little evidence that they are effective against Epstein–Barr virus. Moreover, they are expensive, risk causing resistance to antiviral agents, and (in 1% to 10% of cases) can cause unpleasant side effects.

== See also ==
- Epstein–Barr virus infection
- Epstein–Barr virus-associated lymphoproliferative diseases
- James Corson Niederman, the physician who proved how the Epstein–Barr virus is transmitted in infectious mononucleosis
