= Sjögren syndrome antigen B =

Protein

SSB
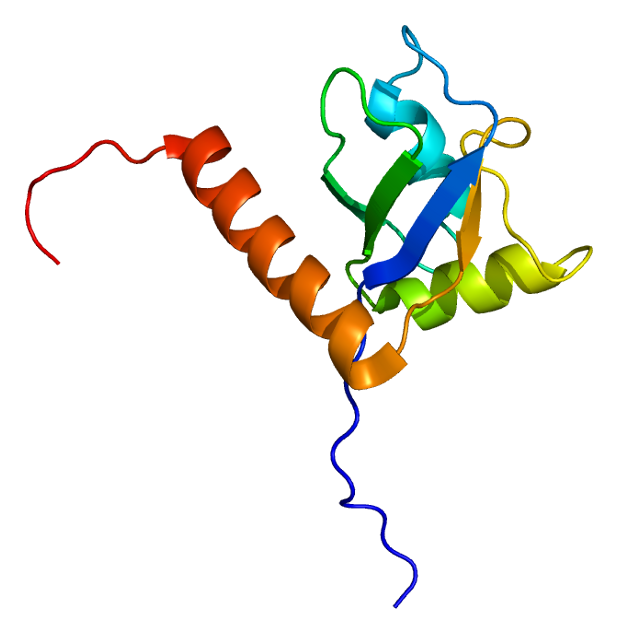

Identifiers
- Aliases: SSB, LARP3, La, La/Sjogren syndrome antigen B, small RNA binding exonuclease protection factor La
- External IDs: OMIM: 109090; MGI: 98423; GeneCards: SSB
Available structures
PDB	Ortholog search: PDBe RCSB
PDB	List of PDB id codes 1OWX, 1S79, 1S7A, 1YTY, 1ZH5, 2VOD, 2VON, 2VOO, 2VOP

Gene location (Human)
Chr.	Chromosome 2 (human)
Band	2q31.1	Start	169,791,933 bp
Band	2q31.1	End	169,812,064 bp

Gene location (Mouse)
Chr.	Chromosome 2 (mouse)
Band	2 C2|2 40.95 cM	Start	69,691,906 bp
Band	2 C2|2 40.95 cM	End	69,702,190 bp
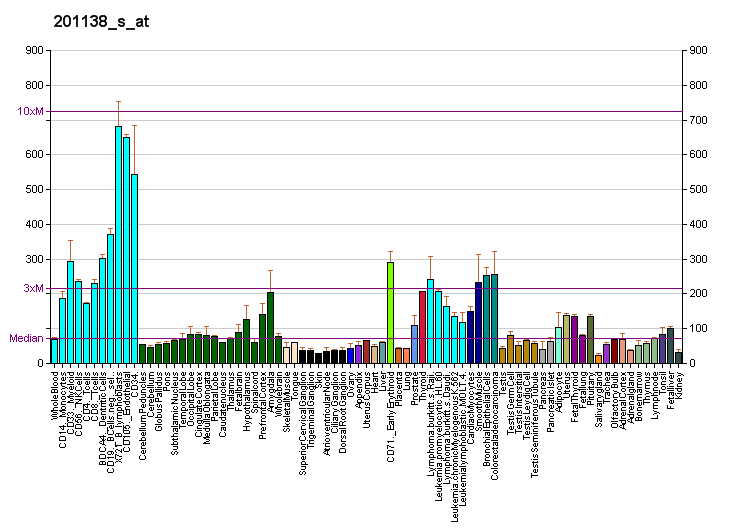

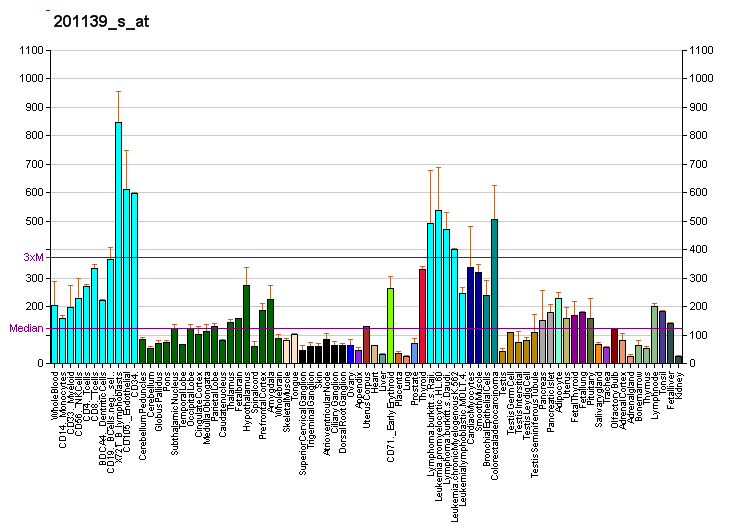
RNA expression pattern
Bgee	Human / Mouse (ortholog); Top expressed in: tendon of biceps brachii; Achilles tendon; ventricular zone; mucosa of paranasal sinus; monocyte; epithelium of nasopharynx; ganglionic eminence; peritoneum; left coronary artery; anterior pituitary / Top expressed in: tail of embryo; genital tubercle; maxillary prominence; mandibular prominence; ventricular zone; embryo; embryo; abdominal wall; supraoptic nucleus; ganglionic eminence; More reference expression data
BioGPS	More reference expression data
Gene ontology
Molecular function	protein binding; mRNA binding; nucleic acid binding; tRNA binding; RNA binding; poly(U) RNA binding; protein homodimerization activity; sequence-specific mRNA binding
Cellular component	nucleus; cytoplasm; ribonucleoprotein complex
Biological process	RNA processing; histone mRNA metabolic process; protein localization to cytoplasmic stress granule; tRNA modification; IRES-dependent viral translational initiation; tRNA 5'-leader removal; tRNA export from nucleus; tRNA processing; tRNA 3'-end processing; nuclear histone mRNA catabolic process
Sources:Amigo / QuickGO
Orthologs
Databases	NCBI: entry; OMA: entry
Species	Human	Mouse
Entrez	6741	20823
Ensembl	ENSG00000138385	ENSMUSG00000068882
UniProt	P05455	P32067
RefSeq (mRNA)	NM_003142; NM_001294145	NM_001110145; NM_009278; NM_001355265
RefSeq (protein)	NP_001281074; NP_003133	NP_001103615; NP_033304; NP_001342194
Location (UCSC)	Chr 2: 169.79 – 169.81 Mb	Chr 2: 69.69 – 69.7 Mb
PubMed search
- Wikidata
View/Edit Human	View/Edit Mouse

Sjögren syndrome type B antigen (SS-B) also known as Lupus La protein is a protein that in humans is encoded by the SSB gene.

== Function ==
La is involved in diverse aspects of RNA metabolism, including binding and protecting 3-prime UUU (OH) elements of newly RNA polymerase III-transcribed RNA, processing 5-prime and 3-prime ends of pre-tRNA precursors, acting as an RNA chaperone, and binding viral RNAs associated with hepatitis C virus. La protein was originally defined by its reactivity with autoantibodies from patients with Sjögren's syndrome and systemic lupus erythematosus.

== Interactions ==
Sjögren syndrome antigen B has been shown to interact with nucleolin.

== See also ==
- La domain
