= Epstein–Barr virus latent membrane protein 1 =

Epstein–Barr virus latent membrane protein 1 (LMP1) is an Epstein–Barr virus (EBV) protein that regulates its own expression and the expression of human genes. It has a molecular weight of approximately 63 kDa, and its expression induces many of the changes associated with EBV infections and activation of primary B cells. LMP1 is the best-documented oncoprotein of the EBV latent gene products, as it is expressed in most EBV-related human cancers such as the various malignant Epstein-Barr virus-associated lymphoproliferative diseases.

The structure of LMP1 consists of a short cytoplasmic terminal tail, six trans-membrane domains, and a long cytoplasmic C-terminus, which contains three activating domains: CTARt, CTAR2, and CTAR3. Each CTAR domain contains an amino acid sequence that serves as a recognition site for cellular adaptors to bind and trigger a series of signal transduction pathways that can lead to a change in gene expression.

LMP-1 is a functional homologue of tumor necrosis factor and mediates signaling through the nuclear factor-κB pathway, mimicking CD40 receptor signaling.

It is often found in the malignant Reed–Sternberg cells of Hodgkin lymphoma, the malignant B cells of EBV-associated B cell lymphatic cancers, and the malignant NK cells of NK/T cell lymphatic cancers.
