= RBPJ =

Protein-coding gene in the species Homo sapiens

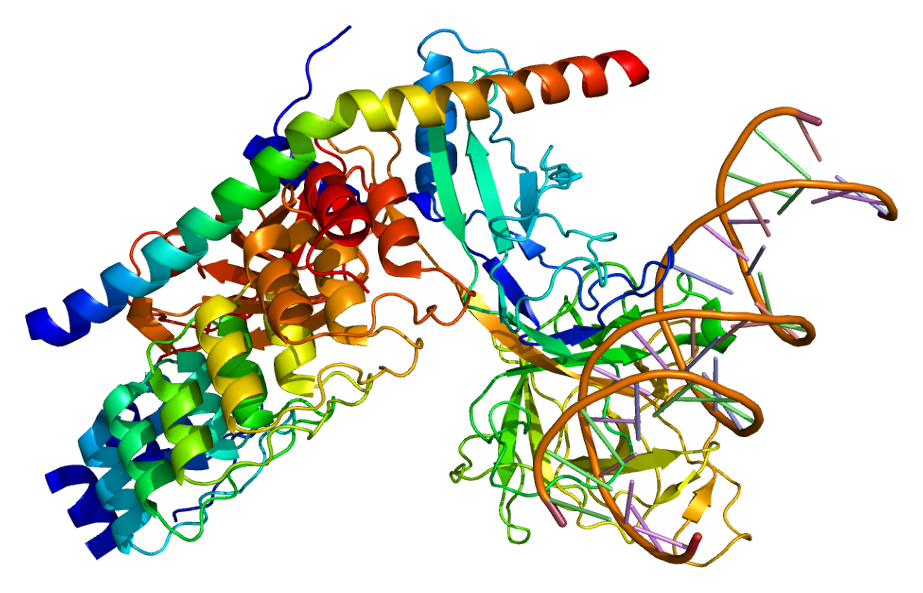

Identifiers
- Aliases: RBPJ, AOS3, CBF1, IGKJRB, IGKJRB1, KBF2, RBP-J, RBPJK, RBPSUH, SUH, csl, recombination signal binding protein for immunoglobulin kappa J region, RBP-J kappa, RBP-JK, CBF-1
- External IDs: OMIM: 147183; MGI: 96522; GeneCards: RBPJ
Available structures
PDB	Ortholog search: PDBe RCSB
PDB	List of PDB id codes 2F8X, 3NBN, 3V79

Gene location (Human)
Chr.	Chromosome 4 (human)
Band	4p15.2	Start	26,163,455 bp
Band	4p15.2	End	26,435,131 bp

Gene location (Mouse)
Chr.	Chromosome 5 (mouse)
Band	5 C1|5 29.37 cM	Start	53,623,494 bp
Band	5 C1|5 29.37 cM	End	53,814,704 bp
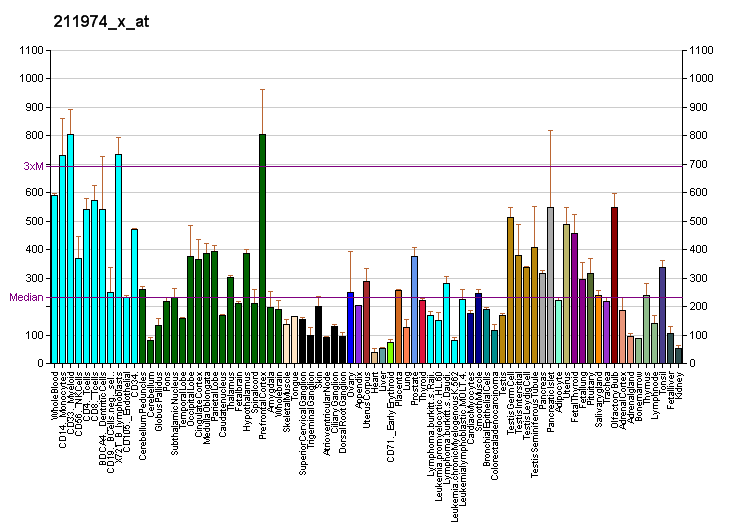
RNA expression pattern
Bgee	Human / Mouse (ortholog); Top expressed in: inferior olivary nucleus; Achilles tendon; nipple; corpus callosum; dorsal motor nucleus of vagus nerve; middle temporal gyrus; synovial joint; inferior ganglion of vagus nerve; pericardium; visceral pleura / Top expressed in: vestibular membrane of cochlear duct; stroma of bone marrow; ventricular zone; zygote; renal corpuscle; carotid body; ciliary body; Paneth cell; medial ganglionic eminence; ankle; More reference expression data
BioGPS	More reference expression data
Gene ontology
Molecular function	protein N-terminus binding; protein binding; DNA strand exchange activity; chromatin binding; DNA-binding transcription activator activity, RNA polymerase II-specific; DNA binding; transcription factor activity, RNA polymerase II core promoter proximal region sequence-specific binding; DNA-binding transcription factor activity; sequence-specific DNA binding; transcription factor binding; RNA polymerase II cis-regulatory region sequence-specific DNA binding; DNA-binding transcription factor activity, RNA polymerase II-specific
Cellular component	nucleolus; MAML1-RBP-Jkappa- ICN1 complex; transcription regulator complex; cytoplasm; nucleus; nucleoplasm; transcription repressor complex
Biological process	artery morphogenesis; regulation of transcription by RNA polymerase II; neuron differentiation; epidermal cell fate specification; positive regulation of cell population proliferation; club cell differentiation; somatic stem cell population maintenance; endocardium development; cell fate commitment; DNA recombination; somitogenesis; positive regulation of transcription from RNA polymerase II promoter in response to hypoxia; defense response to bacterium; regulation of timing of cell differentiation; regulation of transcription, DNA-templated; humoral immune response; keratinocyte differentiation; hair follicle maturation; negative regulation of cell population proliferation; pituitary gland development; negative regulation of cell differentiation; Notch signaling involved in heart development; transcription, DNA-templated; positive regulation of gene expression; arterial endothelial cell fate commitment; myeloid dendritic cell differentiation; blood vessel remodeling; secondary heart field specification; regulation of cell population proliferation; positive regulation of transcription by RNA polymerase II; transcription initiation from RNA polymerase II promoter; sebaceous gland development; positive regulation of canonical Wnt signaling pathway involved in cardiac muscle cell fate commitment; inflammatory response to antigenic stimulus; development of the heart; auditory receptor cell fate commitment; B cell differentiation; regulation of gene expression; Notch signaling pathway; dorsal aorta morphogenesis; atrioventricular canal development; positive regulation of ephrin receptor signaling pathway; epithelial to mesenchymal transition involved in endocardial cushion formation; outflow tract morphogenesis; cardiac left ventricle morphogenesis; negative regulation of transcription by RNA polymerase II; labyrinthine layer blood vessel development; blood vessel lumenization; endocardium morphogenesis; ventricular trabecula myocardium morphogenesis; negative regulation of ossification; positive regulation of cell proliferation involved in heart morphogenesis; positive regulation of cardiac muscle cell proliferation; angiogenesis; epithelial to mesenchymal transition; positive regulation of BMP signaling pathway; positive regulation of ERBB signaling pathway; blood vessel endothelial cell fate specification; negative regulation of transcription, DNA-templated; positive regulation of transcription of Notch receptor target; positive regulation of Notch signaling pathway; hemopoiesis; aortic valve development; pulmonary valve development; ventricular septum morphogenesis; negative regulation of cold-induced thermogenesis
Sources:Amigo / QuickGO
Orthologs
Databases	NCBI: entry; OMA: entry
Species	Human	Mouse
Entrez	3516	19664
Ensembl	ENSG00000168214	ENSMUSG00000039191
UniProt	Q06330	P31266
RefSeq (mRNA)	NM_005349; NM_015874; NM_203283; NM_203284; NM_001363577 NM_001374400; NM_001374401; NM_001374402; NM_001374403; NM_001379406; NM_001379407; NM_001379408; NM_001379409	NM_001080927; NM_001080928; NM_001277116; NM_009035; NM_001359152
RefSeq (protein)	NP_005340; NP_056958; NP_976028; NP_976029; NP_001350506 NP_001361329; NP_001361330; NP_001361331; NP_001361332; NP_001366335; NP_001366336; NP_001366337; NP_001366338	NP_001074396; NP_001074397; NP_001264045; NP_033061; NP_001346081
Location (UCSC)	Chr 4: 26.16 – 26.44 Mb	Chr 5: 53.62 – 53.81 Mb
PubMed search
- Wikidata
View/Edit Human	View/Edit Mouse

Recombination signal binding protein for immunoglobulin kappa J region is a protein that in humans is encoded by the RBPJ gene.

RBPJ also known as CBF1, is the human homolog for the Drosophila gene Suppressor of Hairless. Its promoter region is classically used to demonstrate Notch1 signaling.

== Interactions ==
RBPJ has been shown to interact with:

- NOTCH1
- NCOR2,
- PCAF,
- SND1,
- SNW1,
- SOX18, and
- HIF1a.
