= T-cell lymphoma =

Cancerous overproduction of T cells

T cell lymphoma
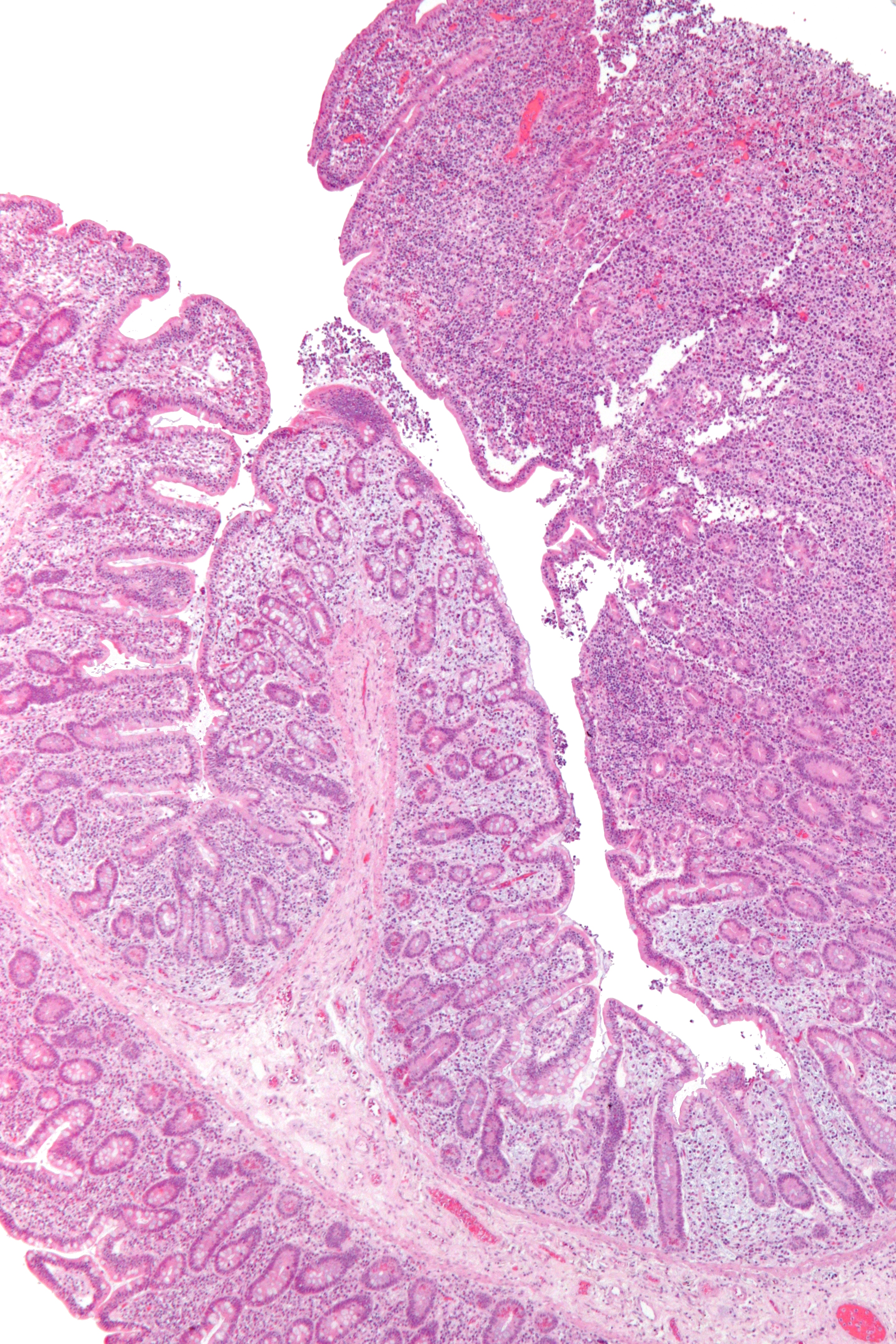
- Micrograph of an enteropathy-associated T cell lymphoma (upper right of image), a type of T cell lymphoma. H&E stain.
- Specialty: Hematology and oncology
- Symptoms: swollen lymph nodes, fevers, enlarged liver or spleen, liver dysfunction, rash
- Risk factors: Autoimmune disorders, Epstein–Barr virus (EBV), Human T-cell leukemia virus-1 (HTLV1), Organ transplants, immunosuppressant therapy
- Treatment: chemotherapy, radiotherapy, stem cell transplant
- Frequency: 0.0005%

T-cell lymphoma is a rare form of cancerous lymphoma affecting T-cells. Lymphoma arises mainly from the uncontrolled proliferation of lymphocytes, such as T-cells, and can become cancerous.

T-cell lymphoma is categorized under Non-Hodgkin lymphoma (NHL) and represents less than 15% of all Non-Hodgkin's diseases in the category. T-cell lymphomas are often categorised based on their growth patterns as either aggressive (fast-growing) or indolent (slow-growing). Although the cause of T-cell lymphoma is not definitive, it has been associated with various risk factors and viruses such as Epstein–Barr virus (EBV) and human T-cell leukemia virus-1 (HTLV1).

The prognosis and treatment of T-cell lymphoma can vary drastically based on the specific type of lymphoma and its growth patterns. Due to their rarity and high variability between the different subtypes, the prognosis of T-cell lymphoma is significantly worse than other Non-Hodgkin lymphoma. The treatment of T-cell lymphoma is often similar to other Non-Hodgkin lymphomas with early-stage treatments consisting of chemotherapy and/or radiotherapy. The effectiveness of these treatments is often varied between subtypes with most receiving a poor outcome with high relapse rates.

== Types ==
There are many types and variations of T-cell lymphoma, each with vastly different symptoms, survival, and prognosis. The classification of T-cell lymphoma has been difficult to accomplish due to the lack of understanding of their biology. Most classifications are basic with many still under the title of 'provisional categories' in the World Health Organization Classification of Diseases.

=== Common ===
- Peripheral T-cell lymphoma, not otherwise specified (PTCL-NOS): Most common type of Peripheral T-cell lymphoma (PTCL), comprising subtypes which cannot be classified as either nodal, extra-nodal, or leukemic
- Angioimmunoblastic T-cell lymphoma (AITL): Aggressive form of T-cell lymphoma.
- Anaplastic large cell lymphoma (ALCL): ALCL has four distinct types:
  - ALK-positive anaplastic large cell lymphoma: an aggressive, systemic ALCL that strongly expresses anaplastic lymphoma kinase, i.e. ALK.
  - ALK-negative anaplastic large cell lymphoma: an aggressive, systemic ALCL that does not express ALK.
  - Primary cutaneous anaplastic large cell lymphoma: a less aggressive ALCL that commonly presents as skin tumors.
  - Breast cancer-associated anaplastic large cell lymphoma: a less aggressive ALCL that occurs around and is caused by breast implants.
- Adult T-cell leukemia/lymphoma (ATL): Aggressive T-cell lymphoma, associated with RNA retrovirus, human T-cell leukemia virus type-1 (HTLV1)
- Extranodal NK/T-cell lymphoma, nasal type (ENKTL): Aggressive T-cell lymphoma, usually associated with Epstein–Barr virus (EBV)
- Cutaneous T-cell lymphoma (CTCL): can be indolent or aggressive
  - Mycosis fungoides
  - Sézary syndrome

=== Rare ===
- Subcutaneous panniculitis-like T-cell lymphoma (SPTCL)
- Cutaneous gamma-delta T-cell lymphoma (CGD-TCL)
- Systemic Epstein–Barr virus-positive T-cell Lymphoproliferative Disorders of Childhood (EBVTCLD): A very aggressive group with association with Epstein–Barr virus (EBV)
- Primary intestinal T-cell lymphomas
  - Enteropathy-associated T-cell lymphoma (EATL)
  - Monomorphic epitheliotropic intestinal T-cell lymphoma (MEITL).
- Hepatosplenic T-cell lymphoma (HSTCL)

== Symptoms and signs ==
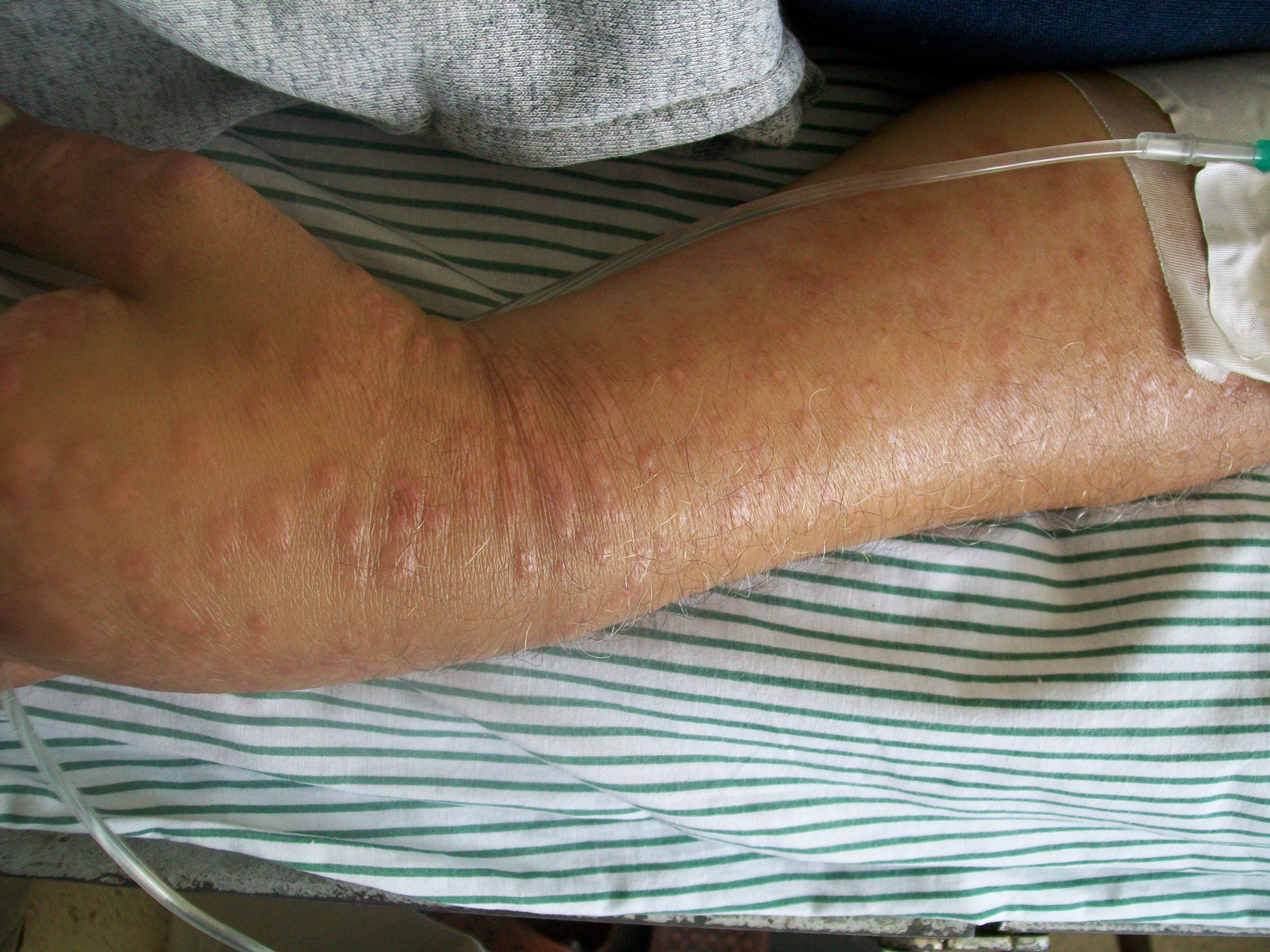
One of the symptoms of Mycosis fungoide include

Differences in T-cell lymphoma subtypes extend to the clinical characteristics and symptoms of the disease with each varying drastically. As a result, there is almost no universally known symptom that can be applied to all T-cell lymphoma subtypes.

=== The hemophagocytic syndrome (HPS) ===
Hemophagocytic syndrome has been associated with most T-cell lymphoma subtypes, and is commonly characterized by fevers, reduction of lymphocyte numbers, enlarged liver or spleen, and liver dysfunction. These symptoms are especially common in extranodal T-cell lymphoma subtypes which develop outside the lymph nodes, such as extranodal NK/T-cell lymphoma, nasal type, and cutaneous T-cell lymphoma (CTCL).

=== Swollen lymph nodes ===
T-cell lymphoma which develops from the lymph nodes commonly causes symptoms such as swollen lymph nodes. The swelling normally will not cause any pain and can be felt or seen as lumps on the surface of the skin. Nodal T-cell lymphoma subtypes such as peripheral T-cell lymphoma will often develop this symptom.

=== Skin infections ===
T-cell lymphoma can cause eczema or rash-like symptoms where small red patches will appear around the skin. These patches will often be irritated and may appear slightly lighter in colour compared to the rest of the skin. Occasionally, small lumps will develop which may rupture and cause the surface layer of the skin to break open. This is especially common in Cutaneous T-cell lymphoma subtypes.

== Cause ==
There is no definitive cause for most T-cell lymphoma subtypes, but a variety of risk factors have been linked to an increased likelihood of developing the disease.

== Risk factors ==
A family history of hematopoietic malignancies has been linked to an increased association with most T-cell lymphoma subtypes. This link is especially elevated among individuals 50 years or younger. However, the link is still considered a hypothesized risk, as research conducted on this link has been insufficient or inconclusive.

Autoimmune conditions are commonly considered a risk factor that has been associated with non-Hodgkin lymphomas, with coeliac disease having an established association with an increased risk of extranodal T-cell lymphoma subtypes.

Organ transplants and immunosuppressant therapy are considered an established risk factor for all Non-Hodgkin lymphoma, including T-cell lymphoma. This risk factor elevates the risk of contracting T-cell lymphoma.

Several infectious agents have been linked to a higher risk of T-cell lymphoma by providing a compromised immune function allowing the establishment of lymphomas. Of these, Epstein–Barr virus (EBV) and Human T-cell leukemia virus-1 (HTLV1) are considered established risks. More than 90% of individuals are exposed to the Epstein–Barr virus in their lifetime. EBV has been consistently associated with many lymphoproliferation disorders; of these, EBV-associated T-cell lymphomas include Epstein–Barr virus–associated lymphoproliferative diseases, angioimmunoblastic T-cell lymphoma (AITL), extranodal NK/T-cell lymphoma, nasal type, and peripheral T-cell lymphoma not otherwise specified (PTCL, NOS).

The human T-cell leukemia virus-1 is endemic in regions such as Japan and the Caribbean and has been associated with the increased risk of T-cell lymphoma such as Adult T-cell leukemia/lymphoma (ATL). HTLV-1 has been attributed to 56% and 78% of all ATL cases in Japan and the Caribbean, respectively.

== Diagnosis ==
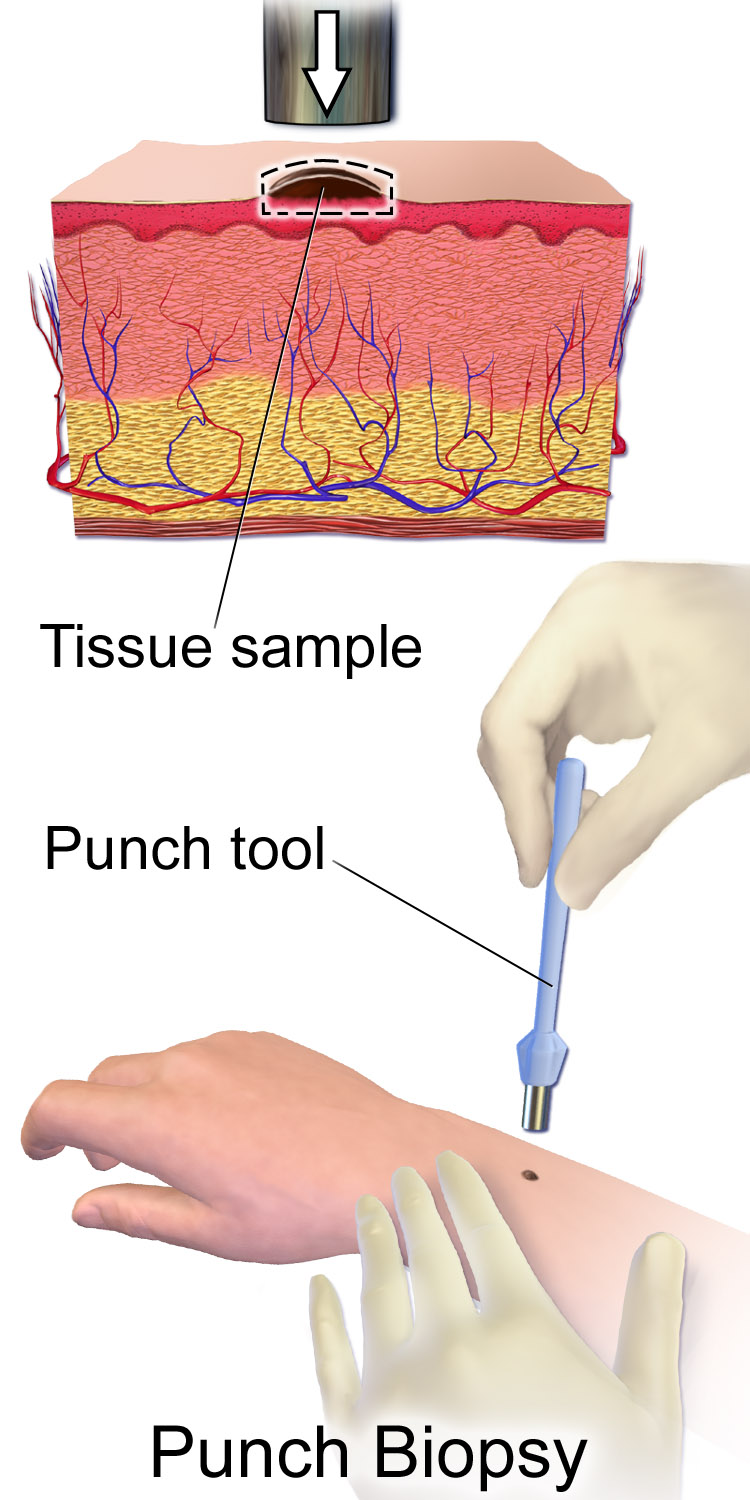
Biopsy Procedure

The diagnosis of T-cell lymphoma varies largely between the subtypes. Some subtypes like anaplastic large-cell lymphoma have an exceptional diagnostic rate; however, for a majority of T-cell lymphoma subtypes, the diagnosis is often flawed due to the difficulty to culture damaged lymphoma cells and the overall low frequency of cases compared to other Non-Hodgkin lymphoma. The current and most accurate diagnosis used across most subtypes is a biopsy in which fresh tissue that is suspected to be affected by the lymphoma is collected from the patient to be closely examined by pathology laboratories. Other diagnostic methods are specific to the type of T-cell lymphoma; physical examination of skin or lymph nodes is common for cutaneous subtypes of T-cell lymphoma whilst others may be diagnosed using blood tests. A series of scans such as CT scan, MRI, ultrasounds, and even X-rays may also be used for diagnostic purposes.

== Treatment ==
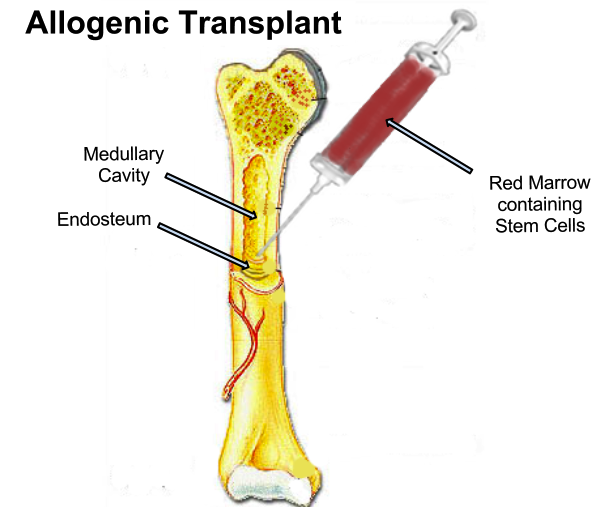
A diagram portraying an allogenic stem cell transplant.

Treatment for T-cell lymphoma varies widely due to the large variability in the subtypes. Due to the lack of research performed in understanding the nature of T-cell lymphoma pathogenesis, a majority of cases will often have poor outcomes for the treatment or will relapse. However, new research into new therapy methods has been made to help reduce the mortality rates and risk of relapse.

=== Chemotherapy ===
Chemotherapy is a drug treatment that involves the use of one or more anti-cancer drugs and is currently the most common treatment method used across all subtypes. T-cell lymphoma is typically treated using the CHOP regimen in which four anti-cancer drugs: cyclophosphamide, doxorubicin, vincristine, and prednisone are used in combination at a relatively high dosage. However, outcomes of the CHOP regimen are often poor with high relapse rates. Other less common chemotherapy regimens which can also be used include: DHAP (dexamethasone, high-dose cytarabine, and cisplatin) and ICE (ifosfamide, carboplatin, etoposide); however, the outcomes of these treatments are often similar to or worse than the CHOP regimen. In order to improve these outcomes, chemotherapy has often been used in conjunction with radiotherapy followed by stem cell transplants.

=== Radiotherapy ===
Radiotherapy is the use of radiation to eradicate cancer. As the electron beams in radiotherapy only penetrate to the level of the dermis, it is a common method of treatment for skin lymphoma which may only occur locally such as Cutaneous T-cell lymphoma; however, it is not recommended for patients with systemic lymphoma conditions.

=== Stem Cell Transplant ===
Stem cell transplants are a common method of treatment which can either be used in conjunction with chemotherapy to improve remission and effectiveness or it can be used with relapsed lymphoma patients. Stem cell transplants can either be an autologous stem cell transplant (ASCT) in which the patient donates their own stem cells or an allogeneic stem cell transplant (alloHCT) in which a related or unrelated healthy donor will donate their stem cells to the patient. Stem cells are collected from the bone marrow and are a type of cell capable of self-renewal and can differentiate into all types of cells, and this can be utilised for patients with T-cell lymphoma and has seen effective results in treating some subtypes, especially angioimmunoblastic T-cell lymphoma.

Allogeneic stem cell transplants are mainly used when the patient lacks adequate healthy stem cells for an autologous stem cell transplant or has relapsed after prior autologous stem cell transplant treatments. However, allogeneic transplants pose a risk as they may be toxic to the patient. Proposed solutions include improved donor selection and the use of a conditioning regime in which a high dose of a myeloablative treatment is given alongside stem cell transplants to reduce the immune response.

=== Monoclonal antibodies ===
Monoclonal antibodies (mAb) utilize antibodies to target tumours; they induce apoptosis of the tumour through the obstruction of survival pathways. Monoclonal antibodies can be used as a single treatment agent; however, they are more effective when used concurrently with chemotherapy to improve survival and remission. Commonly used monoclonal antibodies used to treat T-cell lymphoma include alemtuzumab and denileukin difititox.

=== Nucleoside analogs ===
Nucleoside analogs are a type of antiviral cytotoxic drug used to treat various cancer related diseases. It possesses highly immunosuppressive abilities and acts by inhibiting viral replication and preventing the spread of the cancerous growth. Nucleoside analogs are one of the most active classes of drugs used to treat T-cell lymphoma.

=== Other ===
Other non-traditional treatment options include targeted therapy, protease inhibitors, signaling inhibitors, and HDAC inhibitors.

== Epidemiology ==
While the incidence of Non-Hodgkin's lymphoma has plateaued, the rate of T-cell lymphomas has gradually increased over the past few years. However, due to the low frequency and lack of research performed on the disease, the number of cases is relatively underrepresented in comparison to other non-Hodgkin lymphomas.

Cases are more common in those of Native American descent followed by Caucasian ancestry, however, the epidemiology can vary greatly between the different subtypes. The incidence of T-cell lymphoma is slightly higher in men than in women in all categories of race, with cases increasing in frequency with age for most subtypes.

In Asia, T/NK-cell neoplasms are more common as a result of host factors and the higher prevalence of human T-cell leukemia virus-1 (HTLV1) and Epstein–Barr virus (EBV), while enteropathy-associated T-cell lymphoma (EATCL) is more common among Irish and Welsh populations.

== See also ==
- B-cell lymphoma
- Non-Hodgkin lymphoma
- Hodgkin lymphoma
- Lymphoma
