= Monomorphic epitheliotropic intestinal T cell lymphoma =

- Other names: Enteropathy-associated T cell lymphoma, type II
- Specialty: Hematology and Oncology
- Symptoms: GI tract symptoms
- Duration: Rapidly progressive
- Causes: Malignant T cells
- Prognosis: Poor

Monomorphic epitheliotropic intestinal T cell lymphoma (MEITL) (formerly termed enteropathy-associated T cell lymphoma, type II) is an extremely rare peripheral T-cell lymphoma that involves the malignant proliferation of a type of lymphocyte, the T cell, in the gastrointestinal tract (i.e. GI tract). Over time, these T cells commonly spread throughout the mucosal lining of a portion of the GI tract (particularly the jejunum and ileum of the small intestine), lead to GI tract nodules and ulcerations, and cause symptoms such as abdominal pain, weight loss, diarrhea, obstruction, bleeding, and/or perforation.

In 2008, the World Health Organization defined a specific type of lymphoma, enteropathy-associated T cell lymphoma (EATL), as having two different types: EATL type I, a lymphoma occurring in patients with the chronic, autoimmune GI tract disorder, celiac disease, and EATL type II, a similar bowel lymphoma that was not associated with celiac disease. However, subsequent studies found significant clinical, pathologic, and pathophysiological differences between these two types of lymphoma. Consequently, the World Health Organization (2016) redefined these lymphomas as separate entities, terming the celiac disease-associated lymphoma as enteropathy-associated T cell lymphoma (EATL) and the lymphoma not associated with celiac disease as monomorphic epitheliotropic intestinal T cell lymphoma (MEITL). MEITL is only 1/5 to 1/10 as common as EATL. The Organization (2016) also termed a third type of intestinal T cell lymphoma that could not be classified as ATL or MEITL as intestinal T cell lymphoma, not otherwise specified.

MEITL is a highly aggressive GI tract lymphoma which typically has had very short survival times following its diagnosis. The disease often occurs in elderly patients who are afflicted with other ailments and consequently have little tolerance for the standard chemotherapy regimens that are used to treat other types of lymphomas. Moreover, these therapeutic regimens have shown little effectiveness in treating MEITL. To date, the best but still only marginally effective therapeutic interventions for the disease have been treatments that incorporate hematopoietic stem cell transplantation into chemotherapy plus surgical (when needed to treat local bowel issues such as obstruction or perforation) regimens.

== Presentation ==
MEITL has been seen more often in Asians and individuals of Hispanic descent, in males (male to female ratio of ~2 to 1), and in mature or elderly individuals (median age ~60 years). Patients may present with irregular bowel movements, abdominal pain, hematochezia (i.e. the anal passage of fresh blood), B symptoms (i.e. fever, night sweats, weight loss), loss of appetite, and/or bowel perforations and/or obstructions.

== Pathophysiology ==
The malignant T cells in MEITL can be identified by: their expression of cluster of differentiation (i.e. CD) cell surface molecules CD3, CD8, and CD56; by their failure to express CD4, CD5, or CD30; and, in particular, by their overexpression of megakaryocyte-associated tyrosine kinase. They are not infected with the Epstein-Barr virus and therefore do not express this virus's products (e.g. EBER1 or EBER2). In most individuals with the disease, these T cells are γδ rather than αβ T-cells based on their expression of γδ rather than αβ T-cell receptors. They also commonly express cytotoxic T cell activation markers such as TIA1, granzyme B, and perforin and therefore may have derived from or be related to cytotoxic T cell lymphocytes. However, in up to 25% of cases the malignant cells in MEITL also express markers of B cell lymphocytes. Detection of these "tumor marker" molecules on or in the lymphocytes of diseased tissues is critical for diagnosing MEITL; however, it does not clearly establish the original type of lymphocytes which became MEITL's malignant cells. This issue requires further studies.

MEITL is thought to arise from intraepithelial lymphocytes that normally reside in the epithelial lining of the GI tract and over time acquire abnormalities that promote their survival, proliferation, avoidance of the immune system, and thereby malignancy. These cells are not infected with the Epstein-Barr virus and therefore have not become malignant as a consequence of this virus's malignancy-producing effects on lymphocytes as it does in other types of GI tract lymphomas. Rather, the malignant T cells in MEITL bear various genetic abnormalities that may promote their malignancy. Restriction fragment length polymorphism studies indicate that these cells have abnormal gains in minisatellites, i.e. repetitive small DNA sequences, in chromosomes 1, 5, 7, 8, 9, 13, 16, and 18. These minisatellites disrupt the production of some genes but the potential relevancies of these disruptions have not been defined. Genetic abnormalities commonly found in MEITL that do have potentially pro-malignant effects include:

- Losses on the short (i.e. "p") arm around position 21.3 on one of the two inherited chromosomes 9. This results in a loss of heterozygosity for two genes, the CDKN2A gene which encodes cyclin-dependent kinase Inhibitor 2A, a protein that regulates cell proliferation and the CDKN2B gene which encodes multiple tumor suppressor 2, a protein that regulates cell death and tumor formation.
- A similar loss of heterzygosity on the p arm of chromosome 17 at positions 12 through 13.2. This results in the loss of one of the inherited TP53 genes. TP53 encodes tumor suppressor p53, a protein that regulates cell proliferation, death, and tumor formation.
- Mutations in JAK-STAT signaling pathway genes (i.e. JAK3 and STAT5B). This pathway regulates cell proliferation, death, and tumor formation.
- Mutations in MAPK/ERK pathway genes (i.e. BRAF and KRAS). This pathway regulates cellular proliferation.
- Mutations in the GNA12 gene. This gene encodes Gα12, a G alpha subunit that is required for stimuli to regulate cell function through Gα12-coupled receptors.
- Mutations in the chromatin remodeling gene, SETD2. This gene encodes SET domain containing 2, a protein that acts to reduce the occurrence of gene deletions and tumor formation.
- Mutations in the CREBBP gene. This gene encodes CREB-binding protein, a protein that activates various transcription factors some of which are implicated in tumor development.
- Increased expression of the Myc proto-oncogene. When over-expressed, this genes product, the transcription factor, MYC, stimulates other genes to make their products, some of which stimulate cell proliferation.

Further studies are required to determine which, if any, of these genetic abnormalities play a role in the development and/or progression of MEITL and therefore are therapeutic targets for treating the disease.

== Diagnosis ==
The symptoms of MEITL are generally non-specific. The diagnosis depends on endoscopic findings in the GI tract, histological findings on biopsied specimens from involved areas of the GI tract, evidence of disease involvement outside of the GI tract, and the differentiation of MEITL from other GI tract lymphomas and benign lymphoproliferative diseases. Endoscopy typically shows multiple raised and/or ulcerated lesions involving the jejunum or ileum, and less commonly, the duodenum, stomach, or colon. These lesions may occur at multiple sites or spread throughout large areas of the GI tract. Biopsied tissues show abnormally broad intestinal villi caused by the infiltration of sheets of uniformly-sized lymphocytes. These lymphocytes may also infiltrate and disrupt the architecture of nearby intestinal crypts and the epithelial lining. Unlike celiac disease-associated EATL, the lesions usually have little evidence of inflammatory cells (particularly lymphoplasmacytoid cells, i.e. cells showing a mixture of B cell and plasma cell morphological features) or of infiltration of the epithelium lining by the types of lymphocytes seen in celiac disease. The lymphocytes in these lesions are T cells expressing the marker molecules and genetic abnormalities given in the above Pathophysiology section. CT scans commonly reveal involvement of mesenteric lymph nodes. Advanced cases have involvement of the bone marrow and/or dissemination into other organs.

=== Differential diagnosis ===
MEITL must be differentiated from the following GI tract disorders with which it shares some common features.

- Enteropathy-associated T cell lymphoma (EATL): By definition, MEITL differs from EATL in that EATL specifically occurs in patients with celiac disease. In cases where the presence of celiac disease is not obvious, EATL is differentiated from MEITL by: its occurrence primarily in individuals of Northern European descent, the presence of inflammatory plasmacytoid cells in its lesions, by the tendency of its lesions to consist of γδ rather than αβ T-cell receptor-expressing lymphocytes, by its T cells that express CD30 but not CD56 or megakaryocyte-associated tyrosine kinase. and by most (95%) individuals with EATL being of either the HLA-DQ2 or HLA-DQ8 rather than other HLA-DQ haplotypes.
- Extranodal NK/T cell lymphoma, nasal type (ENKTCL-NT): ENKTCL-NT is a lymphoma that usually involves nasal and oropharyngeal airways but may involve lower areas of the GI tract with lesions that mimic MEITL. Unlike MEITL, it is more commonly due to the proliferation of NK rather than T cell lymphocytes, in all cases is caused by lymphocytes that are infected with the Epstein-Barr virus and therefore express this virus's products, and in almost all cases is caused by lymphocytes that do not express CD3 and have not rearranged their T cell receptors.
- Anaplastic large cell lymphoma, ALK positive (ALCL,ALK+): ALCL,ALK+ is a subtype of anaplastic large cell lymphoma. It commonly involves the malignant proliferation of T cells in tissues outside of the GI tract but in some cases the disease involves primarily the GI tract. Unlike MEITL, ALCL,ALK+ occurs most commonly in young individuals and individuals from Western Countries and most often involves tissue infiltrates of large, anaplastic-appearing T cells which express a fusion gene involving the ALK gene (which encodes Anaplastic lymphoma kinase), but do not express CD3, CD8, or CD56.
- Peripheral T-cell lymphoma not otherwise specified (PTCL-NOS): PTCL-NOS is a heterogenous group of T cell lymphomas that involves lymph nodes, bone marrow, liver, spleen, and/or GI tract. Rarely this lymphoma may present in the GI tract without overt evidence of involvement of other tissues. Unlike MEITL, the T cells in this disease exhibit genetic abnormalities in TET2, IDH2, DNMT3A, RHOA, CD28, and VAV1 genes but in general do not have the genetic abnormalities or express the molecular markers found in MEITL.
- Natural killer cell enteropathy (NKCE): NKCE is a benign disease of the GI tract which has GI tract lesions and symptoms that mimic MEITL. Unlike MEITL, NKCE involves the proliferation of non-clonal NK cell lymphocytes which exhibit activation markers (e.g. granzyme B, perforin, and T-cell intracellular antigen-1) but no genetic abnormalities.
- Indolent T cell lymphoproliferative disorder of the gastrointestinal tract (ITCLD-GT): ITCLD-GT is a generally benign disease of the GI tract that has in some cases progressed to an aggressive lymphoma. It presents with clinical signs and GI tract lesions which may mimic MEITL. These lesions involve infiltrations of T-cells that unlike the T cells in MEITL proliferate slowly, are homogenously small-sized, CD56-negative, may express CD4, and usually do not express CD8.

== Treatment ==
There is no standard treatment for MEITL. Most individuals have been treated by surgical resections of involved areas with or without anthracycline-based chemotherapy. In these cases, responses have been short-lived and/or poor with 1 year overall survival rates, 1 year progression free survival rates, and median survival times of 36%, 21%, and 7 months, respectively. A retrospective study of patients treated with resection, chemotherapy and autologous hematopoietic stem cell transplantation had a higher 1-year and 5-year overall survival (100%, 33%) compared to one-year survival (73%) and five-year survival (14%) without transplantation; a second retrospective study supported the usefulness of transplantation in that high-dose lymphoma chemotherapy followed by transplantation and standard-dose lymphoma chemotherapy with or without surgical resection increased 5-year overall survival from 22 to 60% and 5-year disease progression-free survival from 22 to 52%. While further studies, particularly randomized controlled trials, are needed to investigate the best treatments for MEITL, the use of lymphoma chemotherapy, hematopoietic stem cell transplantation, and, where needed, surgical resections are the currently recommended treatments for MEITL.
