= Natural killer cell enteropathy =

- Other names: NK cell enteropathy, lymphomatoid gastropathy
- Specialty: Hematology and Oncology
- Types: NK cell enteropathy (anywhere in GI tract), lymphomatoid gsatroathy (restricted to stomach)
- Causes: NK cell proliferation due to unknown causes
- Differential diagnosis: Mimics malignant lymphomas
- Treatment: Not necessary
- Prognosis: Good

Natural killer cell enteropathy, also termed NK cell enteropathy (NKCE), and a closely related disorder, lymphomatoid gastropathy (LG), are non-malignant diseases in which one type of lymphocyte, the natural killer cell (i.e. NK cell), proliferates excessively in the gastrointestinal tract (GI tract). This proliferation causes red, sore-like spots, raised lesions, erosions, and ulcers in the mucosal layer surrounding the GI tract lumen. Both disorders cause either no or only vague symptoms of GI tract disturbances such as nausea, vomiting, and bleeding.

In 2006, a persistent but apparently benign disease that involved the proliferation of NK cells at multiple sites throughout the intestines was described. This disorder appeared similar to and easily mistaken for a highly malignant disease, extranodal NK/T-cell lymphoma, nasal type. In 2010, a similarly non-malignant disorder that involved the proliferation of NK cells in the stomach was described. The disease mimicked gastrointestinal lymphomas. Since these first descriptions, several case series and case reports have been published on these enteropathies.

The two NK cell proliferation diseases have been termed NK cell enteropathy and lymphomatoid gastropathy with NKCE being seen mostly in the United States and Korea and LG being seen mostly in Japan. Besides this geographical difference, the only other critical difference between the two diseases is that the lesions in NKCE occur in the small intestine, colon, stomach, and/or esophagus while those of LG are limited to the stomach. Since the pathophysiological features of the two diseases are virtually identical, NKCE and LG are now commonly viewed as manifestations of the same disease.

Only 36 patients with NKCE or LG have been reported as of January 2019. Nonetheless, these diseases are emerging as important clinical entities because they 1) are newly described and likely to be diagnosed more often as they become better known and 2) have been mistaken for, and treated as, various types of pre-malignant and malignant lymphomas of the GI tract. Given the radical differences in the prognoses and treatments of NKCE and LG compared to the lymphomas that they can mimic, the evaluation of many lymphocyte-proliferating disorders of the GI tract must consider and rule out the possibility that they are NKCE or LG rather than a pre-malignant disorder or malignant lymphoma.

== Presentation ==
Most cases of NKCE and LG have been reported in middle-aged or older individuals. Patients diagnosed with NKCE (medium age 46 years) have presented with vague abdominal pain, indigestion, vomiting, diarrhea, constipation, weight loss, anemia, and/or GI bleeding. Two patients complained of biliary colic (i.e. gallbladder pain) and were found to have typical lesions of NKCE in their cystic ducts. These two cases indicate that NKCE involvement is not totally limited to the alimentary canal. Three of 15 individuals diagnosed with NKCE disease reported no symptoms, their disease being found on endoscopy conducted for screening purposes. Typically, patients diagnosed with LG (medium age 58 years) have been asymptomatic at presentation with their disease being detected during GI tract examinations done for other reasons. Three of twenty patients diagnosed with LG complained of pain or discomfort in the upper abdominal region. Symptomatic individuals with either disease generally have a long history of persistent or intermittent symptoms.

== Pathophysiology ==
NK cells normally occupy the GI tract where they contribute to innate immunity by becoming active in killing pathogen-infected and cancerous cells. The proliferating lymphocytes in NKCE and LG express CD56 and CD7 proteins on their cell surface membrane, CD3γ protein in their cytoplasm, and granzyme B, perforin, and T-cell intracellular antigen-1 cytotoxic proteins within their cytoplasmic granules. This pattern of protein expression identifies these cells as NK cells that, because of their expression of the cytotoxic granule-bound proteins, have been activated. However, the cause(s) for the activation of these cells as wells as for their rapid proliferation to produce NKCE and LG is unknown. To date, no evidence of NK cell clonality (i.e. cells developing from a single precursor) or for these cells to bear gene mutations or chromosome abnormalities have been reported in NKCE or LG. These findings help distinguish LB and NKCE from many lymphomas and support the conclusion that neither disease is malignant. The NK cells in LG and NKCE are not infected with the Epstein-Barr virus (EBV), as evidenced by their failure to express this virus's latency proteins and latency ncRNAs. This finding indicates that EBV is not the cause for the NK cell activation and excessive proliferation seen in NKCE and LG and distinguishes these diseases from malignant diseases they can mimic such as extranodal NK/T-cell lymphoma, nasal type. In isolated reports, LG has occurred in individuals with Helicobacter pylori infection of the stomach or a history of stomach cancer, while NKCE has been reported to occur in patients with gluten sensitivity or circulating anti-gliadin antibodies. Both of the latter conditions are associated with the development of GI tract lymphomas. However, the relationship of any of these findings to the etiology of LB and NKCE is unclear.

== Histology ==
Biopsies of NKCE tissues reveal atypical medium to large lymphocytes identified by immunohistochemistry to be NK cells that are multiplying at a moderately rapid rate and that lack evidence of being infected by the Epstein-Barr virus. These cells are located primarily in the lamina propria, i.e. loose connective tissue lying just below the epithelium lining the GI tract. There is generally little invasion of these cells into the epithelium, submucosa, or glands of the GI tract, and the lesions almost always show a complete absence of vascular injury due to invasion by these cells. The lesions in LG closely resemble those of NKCE.

== Diagnosis ==
The diagnoses of NKCE and LG depends on clinical and pathological findings indicating that the two diseases: a) are indolent and non-malignant; b) usually manifested by mild, vague, or no symptoms; c) localize to the GI tract without involvement of the head, neck, or organs such as the liver and spleen; d) consist of one or more lesions localized primarily to the lamina propria of the esophagus, stomach, small intestine, and/or large intestine (for NKCE} or to the stomach (for LG); and e) involve lesions which contain medium-to large-sized, atypical, and non-clonal lymphocytes that are activated NK cells (see Pathophysiology section) which proliferate at moderately rapid rates (as gauged by, e.g. analysis of their Ki-67 protein levels), lack evidence of Epstein-Barr virus infection, gene mutations, or chromosome abnormalities, and show little evidence of centering around, and destroying, blood vessels.

=== Differential diagnosis ===
In early studies, aggressive chemotherapy with or without bone marrow translanton and gastric resections were used to treat NKCE and LG, respectively, based on the assumptions that these diseases were malignant. Since there was no evidence that these treatments influenced the underlying disease and since NKCE and LG are essentially benign disorders, they must be distinguished from the malignant diseases which they mimic. Three malignant or potentially premalignant diseases which can closely resemble NKCE and LG along with some clinical and laboratory findings which differentiate them from NKCE and LT are:

- Extranodal NK/T cell lymphoma, nasal type: This disease can closely mimic NKCE and, to a lesser extent, LG. In contrast to NKCE and LG, extranodal NK/T cell lymphoma, nasal type: is malignant and often aggressive; causes serious, persistent, and often progressive GI tract and other symptoms; commonly involves the head and neck areas and/or multiple organs outside of the GI tract; is deeply invasive, extending beyond the lamina propia of the GI tract; and consists of lesions which contain malignant Epstein-Barr virus-infected NK cells that have numerous gene mutations and chromosome abnormalities and that center around and destroy blood vessels.
- Monomorphic epitheliotropic intestinal T cell lymphoma (MEITL): MEITL is a malignant and extremely aggressive GI tract disease. It is manifested by serious, sometimes life-threatening GI tract symptoms such as GI tract obstructions and perforations; is usually localized to the small intestine but may involve other areas of the GI tact; is invasive, e.g. spreads to the submucosa; commonly metastasizes to GI tract lymph nodes; and is composed of lesions which contain Epstein-Barr virus-negative homogenously appearing, medium-sized, malignant T cells that may have mutations or other genetic abnormalities in their STAT5B, JAK3, TP53, SETD2, BRAF, KRAS, GNA12, CREBBP, and/or Myc genes.
- Indolent T cell lymphoproliferative disorder of the gastrointestinal tract: This recently described disease, while generally considered benign, has in rare cases been lethal with disease spreading to the bone marrow and blood. This disease is a potentially precancerous condition. Indolent T-cell lymphoproliferative disorder almost always presents with significant GI tract severe symptoms (chronic diarrhea, weight loss, abdominal pain, and/or GI bleeding); involves multiple lesions, most commonly located in the small intestine, colon, and, rarely, stomach, esophagus, and oral cavity; exhibits lesions that resemble those of NKCE and LG but involve infiltrations of T-cells that unlike the NK cells of NKCE and LG, are slowly proliferating, homogenously small-sized, CD56-negative, usually express CD4 and CD8, are not infected by the Epstein-Barr virus, are clonal in nature based on their T-cell receptor rearrangements, and, while located primarily in the lamina propria, may infiltrate into nearby submucosal tissue.

Other diseases which NKCE and LG may superficially resemble and require consideration as being in their differential diagnoses include: peripheral T-cell lymphoma not otherwise specified, T cell lymphomas that consist of mature T cells and occur in the GI tact, MALT lymphoma of the stomach, and other types of stomach lymphomas.

== Treatment ==
Patients with NKCE or LG should be treated for symptom relief but, as currently recommended, not for the underlying NK cell proliferative disease. Regular follow-ups that include repeated endoscopic analyses of their GI tracts and tests for the spreading of the disease to other organs are recommended to insure the original diagnosis is correct.

== Prognosis ==
NKCE and LG usually follow a persistent or regressing-relapsing coarse but uncommonly spontaneously relapses without a recurrence even in cases that have been mistreated with chemotherapy, bone marrow transplantation, or gastric resection. Patients with LG are less likely to have persistent or regressing-relapsing coarse. Symptoms of the disease usually remain vague and mild.
