= Enteropathy-associated T-cell lymphoma =

Complication of celiac disease

Enteropathy-associated T-cell lymphoma (formerly termed enteropathy-associated T-cell lymphoma, type 1)
- Other names: Enteropathy-associated T-cell lymphoma, type I
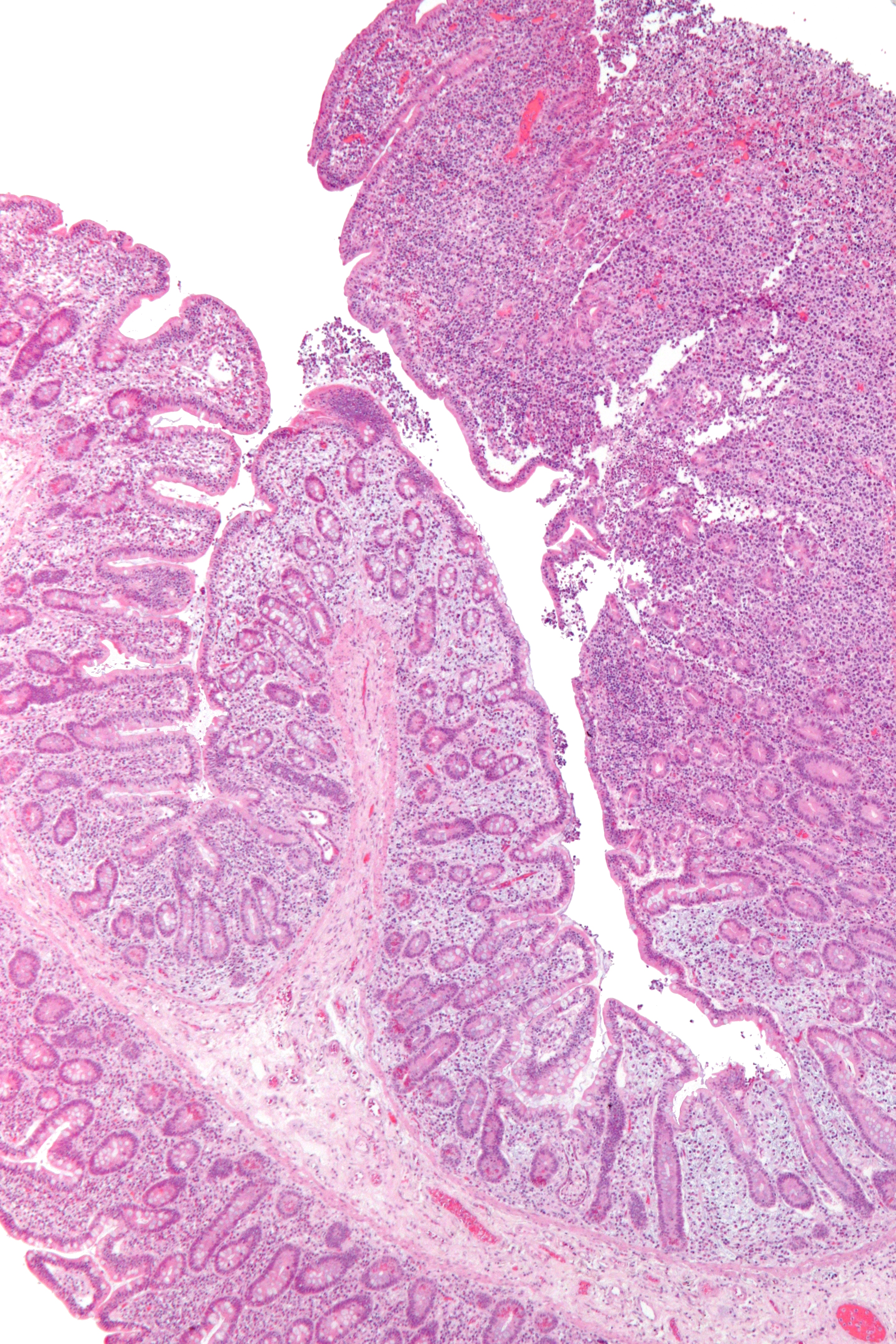
- Micrograph of enteropathy-associated T cell lymphoma (upper right of image). H&E stain.
- Specialty: Oncology, hematology, gastroenterology
- Complications: Bowel obstructions, bowel perforations
- Causes: Complication of celiac disease
- Risk factors: Genetic predisposition
- Prevention: Gluten-free diet
- Prognosis: guarded

Enteropathy-associated T-cell lymphoma (EATL), previously termed enteropathy-associated T-cell lymphoma, type I and at one time termed enteropathy-type T-cell lymphoma (ETTL), is a complication of celiac disease in which a malignant T-cell lymphoma develops in areas of the small intestine affected by the disease's intense inflammation. While a relatively rare disease, it is the most common type of primary gastrointestinal T-cell lymphoma. In 2008, the World Health Organization (WHO) divided the disease into two subtypes: EATL type I and EATL type II. EATL typically occurs in patients with a history of celiac disease and who may have been previously diagnosed with Type I or II refractory disease.

Affected individuals present with worsening celiac disease symptoms of abdominal pain, malabsorption, diarrhea, weight loss, fever or night sweats. The cause of EATL, while not fully understood, is by definition related to celiac disease. The diagnosis of EATL is based on endoscopic findings. The disease is being studied by researchers.

== Description ==
Enteropathy-associated T-cell lymphoma (EATL) is a complication of coeliac disease in which a malignant T-cell lymphoma develops in areas of the small intestine affected by the disease's intense inflammation. It was previously termed enteropathy-associated T-cell lymphoma, type I and at one time termed enteropathy-type T-cell lymphoma (ETTL). While a relatively rare disease, it is the most common type of primary gastrointestinal T-cell lymphoma.

EATL had been defined as a single type of small intestine lymphoma, but in 2008, the World Health Organization (WHO) divided the disease into two subtypes:

1. EATL type I, which occurs in individuals with coeliac disease, a chronic immune disorder causing inflammatory responses to dietary gluten primarily in the upper reaches (i.e., jejunum and duodenum) of the small intestine.
2. EATL type II, a disorder similar to EATL type I that occurs without coeliac disease.

While type I and II EATL share many similar features, post-2008 studies found some significant differences between the two types. In 2016, the WHO redefined the two diseases as separate entities, keeping the term enteropathy-associated T-cell lymphoma for the coeliac disease-associated lymphoma and terming type 2 disease as monomorphic epitheliotropic intestinal T cell lymphoma (MEITL). EATL is five to ten times more common than is MEITL. The WHO also defined a third type of intestinal T-cell lymphoma that cannot not be classified as EATL or MEITL as peripheral T-cell lymphoma not otherwise specified (ITCL-NOS).

EATL arises from the malignant transformation of small-intestinal intraepithelial lymphocytes (IEL). IEL are a heterogeneous group of principally T-cell lymphocytes residing in epithelial tissues that interface the environment, such as the mucosa of the bronchi, reproductive tract and gastrointestinal tract. At these sites, IEL are exposed and regulate immune responses to non-dietary and dietary antigens, pathogenic and non-pathogenic organisms and injured self tissues. Gastrointestinal tract IEL appear in the epithelium of the small intestine, colon, stomach and esophagus, residing between the epithelial cells that line these organs' lumens. These IEL often exhibit natural killer and cytotoxic T-cell cell activation markers, contain various toxic agents (e.g. perforin, granzyme) and therefore are capable, if activated, of causing severe tissue injuries. With coeliac disease, the IEL react to the glutelins in dietary gluten by increasing their numbers, becoming pathologically active, producing chronic inflammation that injures intestinal cells, interfering with nutrient absorption and creating an environment conducive to their malignant transformation into EATL.

Optimal treatment of EATL has used regimens consisting of intensive chemotherapy, hematopoietic stem cell transplantation and, in cases with bulky, obstructive and/or perforated bowel disease, surgical intervention. The disease has a five-year overall survival rate of only ~20%. However, recent studies focusing on the malignant IEL in EATL have increased understanding of the disease and suggested newer chemotherapy-based strategies and novel molecular targets that might be attacked therapeutically to improve the disease's prognosis.

== Presentation ==
EATL typically occurs in patients with a history of coeliac disease and who may have been previously diagnosed with Type I or II refractory disease, but in any case, affected individuals present with worsening coeliac disease symptoms of abdominal pain, malabsorption, diarrhea, weight loss, fever or night sweats. EATL diagnosis is more likely if symptoms develop suddenly, or if the serious symptoms of bowel obstruction and/or bowel perforation caused by bulky EATL masses develop. Patients with ulcerative jejunitis usually present with more severe symptoms, including more frequent bowel perforations and obstructions. Some patients with no history of coeliac disease present with symptoms or signs of a small-intestinal lymphoma but on diagnostic workup are found to have coeliac disease.

== Pathophysiology ==
=== Genetics ===
The cause of EATL, while not fully understood, is by definition related to celiac disease. Individuals are genetically predisposed to develop celiac disease because of the specific types of HLA-DQ proteins expressed by their antigen-presenting cells (APC). HLA-DQ proteins are on the surface of APC and function to present foreign or self antigens to the T cell receptors (TCR) expressed on the surface of T-cells and thereby to stimulate these cells either to initiate or suppress immune responses to the presented antigens. HLA-DQ proteins are composed of α and β polypeptide chains encoded by the HLA-DQA1 and HLA-DQB1 genes, respectively. Since there are several different alleles (i.e. gene variants) at these two genetic loci, individuals are usually heterozygous, i.e. have inherited different alleles from each parent at each locus; uncommonly, however, individuals are homozygous at one or both loci because their parents have the same alleles at one or both loci. The HLA-DQ proteins that predispose individuals to coeliac disease bind and respond specifically to gluten-related antigens presented to them by APC. The genetic predisposition to develop coeliac disease is clinically determined by identifying the serotypes of an individual's APC's HLA-DQ proteins using serotype-specific antibody preparations and/or by identifying the alleles at an individual's HLA-DQA1 and HLA-DQB1 genetic loci. Studies show that:

- Celiac disease affects ~1% of the population in most parts of the world.
- Ninety to one hundred percent of patients with coeliac disease have inherited genes at the HLA-DQ locus that encode HLA-DQ2 and/or HLA-DQ8 serotype proteins.
- About 2–3% of individuals who inherit these HLA-DQ2 and/or HLA-DQ8 serotypes develop coeliac disease.
- About 90% of coeliac disease patients are homozygous for (i.e. inherited from both parents) either the HLADQA1*0501 or HLADQA1*0505 alleles at the HLA-DQA1 locus plus either the HLADQB1*0201 or HLA-DQB1*0202 alleles at the HLA-DQB1 locus; <5% of coeliac disease patients are heterozygous (i.e. inherited from just one parent) for these alleles; and 5–10% of coeliac disease patients have inherited HLA-DQA1*03 plus HLA-DQB1*0302 alleles at the respective HLA-DQA1 and DAQB1 loci.
- Less than 1% of all individuals with coeliac disease develop EATL.
- Individuals homozygous for the HLADQB1*0201 allele at the HLA-DQB1 locus develop a particularly severe and tissue-damaging form of coeliac disease and have a greatly increased rate of developing EATL.
- The vast majority of patients with coeliac disease who develop EATL have either the HLADQA1*0501 or HLADQB1*0201 allele (see previous paragraphs) at the HLA-DQB1 locus.

=== Intraepithelial lymphocytes ===
IEL are a diverse population of lymphocytes, which unlike most peripheral lymphocytes, do not recirculate through the blood and/or lymphatic system but rather reside permanently in the epithelium of various organs. In the GI tract, IEL localize between the epithelial cells lining the colon, small intestine, stomach, and esophagus where they serve to maintain the mucosal barrier, combat infection by pathogens, and regulate immune responses to antigens originating from the diet, pathogens, and damaged tissues. Human IEL are classified into those which express the TCR (i.e. TCL+IEL) and those which do not (i.e. TCR-IEL). TCL+IEL are further divided into 4 subtypes, TCRαβ+CD4+ IEL, TCRαβ+CD4+CD8αα+ IEL, TCRαβ+CD8αβ+ IEL, and TCRλδ+CD8αα+. These subtypes are based on the expression of alpha (α) and beta (β) chain-containing TCR (i.e. αβTCR); gamma (γ) and delta (δ) chain-containing TCR (i.e. γδTCR); CD4; CD8αβ; and/or CD8αα by individual IEL.. A fifth TCL+IEL subtype, TCRαβ+CD8αα+, occurs in mice but its presence in the human intestine is disputed. Human TCR-IEL are also divided into 4 sub-types: their: ILC1-like IEL have morphological and functional similarities to normal intestinal epithelial cells and express NKp46; ICL3-like IEL have morphological similarities to normal epithelial cells and, similar to Th1 cells, make Interleukin 17 (IL-17) and Interleukin 22 (IL-22) cytokines and express the RORγt transcription factor and NKp44; iCD3-IEL express iCD3; and iCD8α-IEL express iCD3 and CD8α. CD3 designates a protein complex that is attached to the cell surface membrane whereas iCD3 refers to a CD3 protein complex in which one or more of its proteins resides abnormally in the cell's cytosol Studies suggest that iCD3+IEL are the principal cell type that becomes malignant in EATL cases that are not classified as de novo (see next section). These cells also express CD103 and, frequently, CD30.

=== Acquisition of malignancy ===
Coeliac disease patients may be asymptomatic, minimally symptomatic, and/or well-controlled on a gluten-free diet (i.e. a diet free of cereal, rye, wheat, and barley) but nonetheless develop EATL. About 46% of all AETL cases occur in this setting and have had their malignancy described as de novo EATL. The remaining ~54% of EATL cases develop in coeliac disease patients whose disease becomes refractory to dietary control, exhibits increasing symptoms, and progress over ~4–10 years through Type I refractor coeliac disease (Type 1 RCD) and Type II refractory coeliac disease (Type II RCD) to become EATL. The rates at which non-refractory celiac disease, Type I RCD, and Type II RCD progress to de novo or EATL are <1%, 3–14%, and 33–52%, respectively.

==== De novo EATL ====
De novo EATL can occur in individuals whose coeliac disease was undiagnosed until EATL was found or who have mild/well-controlled coeliac disease. The findings in these patients usually differ little from those found in mild/well-controlled cases that do not progress to EATL; their small intestinal mucosa is populated by increased number of IEL and exhibits tissue destruction (e.g. small intestinal villus atrophy), Nonetheless, their IEL are normal-appearing, small cells that on examination are polyclonal (i.e. genetically diverse), express CD3 and CD8, and do not have genetic abnormalities. The mechanism behind the development of EATL in these individuals is not understood.

==== Type I refractory coeliac disease ====
Type I RCD patients, who constitute 15–23% of all patients with RCD, are refractory to the gluten diet as evidenced by their worsening symptoms, increased tissue destruction, and rising numbers of TCRαβ+CD*αβ+IEL in tissue lesions. Some Type I RCD patients may have failed to respond to the diet from the onset of their disease. If either cases, these patients show no change in the normal appearance and polyclonal nature of their small intestinal IEL and these IEL show no genetic abnormalities. The cause for these coeliac disease patients progressing to Type I RCD, after excluding the very common problem of failure to fully exclude gluten from their diets, is either due to their genetic makeup (see above section on genetics) or is unknown.

==== Type II refractory coeliac disease ====
Type I RCD patients may progress to Type II RCD as evidenced by their more severe symptoms, increased intestinal tissue destruction, and expanding numbers of intestinal IEL, particularly iCD3+IEL. Their IEL typically consist of genetically different subpopulations of cells that have a monoclonal rearrangement of their TCR and therefore are descendant from a single ancestral cell. Subpopulations of these IEL also have one or more of the following genetic abnormalities: trisomy of chromosome 1's long (or "q") arm at position 22–44 (abbreviated 1-q22–24); genomic alterations around the TP53 tumor suppressor gene at position 13.1 on the short or "p" arm of chromosome 17; genomic alterations around the CDKN2A tumor suppressor and CDKN2B cell proliferation regulator at position p21.3 on chromosome 9 that result in loss of heterozygosity for both genes; and/or activating mutations in JAK1 (75% of cases) and STAT3 (25% of cases). In Type II RCD, the same types of abnormal ILE found in the small intestine may be detected in the colon, stomach, mesenteric lymph nodes, blood, bone marrow, and epithelium of the airways and skin. Finally, the small intestinal lesions in Type II RCD contain IL-2 and IL-21 as well as increased levels of IL-15. Laboratory studies indicate that these 3 cytokines acting individually or in synergy are potent stimulators of the JAK1/STAT3 signaling pathway in iCD3+IEL and thereby promote these cells survival (by blocking apoptosis) and proliferation. The small intestinal lesions also contain a tumor necrosis factor which stimulates iCD3+IEL survival and proliferation but does so by activating NF-κB, MAPK, and/or c-Jun N-terminal kinases rather than JAK1/STAT3 signaling pathway. These data suggest that:

1. Type II RCD is a low grade lymphoma;
2. the intense inflammation in Type II RCD, perhaps amplified by the cited cytokines, promotes the proliferation, survival, genome instability, and consequential genetic abnormalities in IEL;
3. one or more of these factors cause the transformation of Type II RD to EATL. As currently understood, the release of IL-15 by mucosal epithelial cells, the binding of IL-15 to the IL-15Rβ cell surface receptor on iCD3+IEL, and the stimulation thereby of these cells appears particularly important in driving Type II RCD to EATL in a significant number of cases.

===== Ulcerative jejunitis =====
Ulcerative jejunitis (also termed chronic ulcerative jejunitis, multifocal ulcerated microlymphomas, ulcerative jejunoileitis, and chronic ulcerative jejunoileitis) is regarded as a rare complications or severe form of Type II RCD in which the jejunum or jejunum plus ileum portions of the small intestine contain multifocal ulcers. Patients with this disorder have a higher risk of developing EATL than other Type II RCD patients.

==== EATL ====
Besides the genetic gene abnormalities found in Type II RCD, the malignant IEL in EATL consist of one or more subpopulations that have mutations: in other JAK-STAT pathway genes viz., STAT5B, JAK3, and SOCS1 (SOCS1 inhibits STAT signaling); tumor suppressor genes BCL11B and SETD2 (SETD2 is also involved in regulating lymphocyte development); another gene involved in lymphocyte development, PRDM1; a gene promoting activation of the tumor suppressor p53, IRF1; DNA repair genes BRIP1 and TERT (TERT is also involved in maintaining DNA telomeres and thereby chromosome stability); the NRAS and KRAS oncogenes; a gene involved in progression of the cell cycle and thereby cellular proliferation, STK10; a gene involved in promoting cell death by apoptosis, DAPK3; a gene involved in regulating Interferon gamma actions, inhibiting toll-like receptor signaling, and regulating activation of innate and adaptive immune systems, IRF4; a gene involved in cell signaling through various cell receptors, GNAS; a gene involved in production of the immunoglobulin, IgA, BBX; and two chromatin remodeling genes, TET2 and YLPM1. These cells also overexpress or under express various genes that impact cell survival, growth, and malignancy. It is likely that one or more of these genetic and gene expression abnormalities contribute to the malignant behavior of EATL.

== Diagnosis ==
The diagnosis of EATL is based on endoscopic findings of:

1. flattened duodenal folds and small intestinal fissures and ulcers
2. biopsy findings of small intestinal inflammation, increased IEL, villous atrophy, and crypt hyperplasia
3. HLA-DG serology typing and/or gene allele analyses showing results compatible with coeliac disease (see above section on genetics)
4. positive serology tests for IgA antitissue translutamase antibodies, IgA antibodies to deamidated gliadin peptides, IgG antibodies to deamidated gliadin peptides, and/or IgA antibodies to antitissue translutamase

About 35% of EATL cases will be found to have spread of the disease to extra-intestinal sites with lesions in the mesenteric lymph nodes (~35% of cases), bone marrow (<10% of cases), and, uncommonly, blood that contain IEL with the same genetic abnormalities and cell markers as those found in the IEL of their intestinal lesions. Intestinal biopsy specimens of EATL lesions also commonly show the presence of mucosal inflammatory cells (particularly eosinophils and histiocytes); a greatly expanded population of medium- to large-sized or anaplastic IEL expressing iCD3 as well as cytotoxic and cell activation markers (e.g. granzyme B and usually TIA1 and perforin); and, frequently CD30. In most cases these IEL also show genetic abnormalities, particularly activating mutations in JAK1 and/or STAT3 and to lesser extents those cited in the above section on EATL. The malignant IEL in EATL do not express CD56. Rarely, patients present with EATL who have no gastrointestinal symptoms of celiac disease but rather with extra-intestinal manifestations that are associated with the disease such as dermatitis herpetiformis, psoriasis, other chronic skin conditions, dental enamel defects, gluten-induced cerebellar ataxia, arthritis, and arthralgias.

=== Differential diagnosis ===
Other gastrointestinal T-cell lymphomas can resemble, and therefore need to be differentiated from, EATL. These include:

- Monomorphic epitheliotropic intestinal T cell lymphoma is distinguished from EATL in that it is not associated with celiac disease; is more common in Asians than Northern Europeans; and their small intestine lesions show little or no inflammatory cells plus numerous small- to medium-sized, normal appearing IEL that express CD56 but may not express CD30. The genetic abnormalities found in Monomorphic epitheliotropic intestinal T cell lymphoma are similar to those in EATL.
- Small intestinal adenocarcinoma, while rare, is far more frequent in coeliac disease than in the general population. Unlike EATL, it often occurs in celiac disease patients who, while otherwise well-maintained on a gluten-free diet, have vague gastrointestinal symptoms such as fatigue, malaise, and weight loss. However, it can cause severe symptoms such as bowel obstruction and intestinal bleeding. Also unlike EATL, the adenocarcinoma often occurs in women and younger (<50 years old) individuals; is more likely to begin as a non-maligant adenoma; and has the histology typical of an adenocarcinoma.
- Peripheral T-cell lymphoma not otherwise specified (PTCL-NOS) and anaplastic large cell lymphoma (ALCL) are heterogeneous sets of aggressive T cell lymphomas that exhibit variable morphologies. Unlike EATL, they are not associated with coeliac disease and rarely present as an intestinal lymphoma without involvement of extra-intestinal tissues. PTCL-NOS's genetic abnormalities differ from those in EATL: its malignant cells have recurrent mutations in TET2, IDH2, DNMT3A, RHOA, VAV1, and/or CD28 genes, rearrangements of the ITK gene with the SYK, FER, and ERBB4 genes, and/or rearrangements of the TP63 gene. ALCL likewise exhibits different mutations than those occurring in EATL; its malignant cells, similar to those in PTCL-NOS, have recurrent mutations in VAV1, rearrangements of the ITK gene with the SYK, FER, and ERBB genes, and/or rearrangements of the TP63 gene. However, ALCL also has distinctive genetic abnormalities: malignant cells in the ALK+ form of ALCL have a translocation between the NPM1 and ALK genes to form a gene encoding the chimeric protein, NPM-ALK while the malignant cells in the ALK- form of ALCL have translocations of either the DUSP22 or TP63 genes.
- Epstein–Barr virus–associated lymphoproliferative diseases are a large group of benign, pre-malignant and malignant lymphoproliferative diseases that are associated with the infection of lymphocytes by the Epstein–Barr virus. One of these diseases, Extranodal NK/T cell lymphoma, nasal type may develop primarily in the small intestine but unlike EATL often involves lesions in the nasal cavity, pharynx, lung, skin, or other tissues. Furthermore, the malignant T cells in this disease express readily detectable products encoded by the Epstein–Barr virus's genes whereas those of EATL are not infected with this virus and therefore do not express these viral products.
- Indolent T cell lymphoproliferative disorder of the gastrointestinal tract (ITCLD-GT)) is a rare, slowly progressive, and potentially premalignant disorder of the GI tract that may be mistaken of EATL, particularly with respect to the severity of its symptoms, the gross pathology of its intestinal lesions, and the presence in its intestinal lesions of T cells that have monoclonal rearrangements of their TCR as well as genetic abnormalities in the JAK/STAT signaling pathway. Unlike EATL, ITCLD-GT is not associated with coeliac disease; often involves symptomatic lesions of the upper GI tract (i.e. stomach, esophagus, and pharynx); and has GI tract lesions populated by T cells that express CD3 (rather than iCD3), do not express CD56, and, in many cases, express an abnormal STAT3–JAK2 fusion gene.

== Prevention ==
Strict adherence to a gluten-free diet has been shown in some but not all studies to prevent in a significant number of cases the progression of coeliac disease to Type I RCD, Type II RCD, and EATL. For example, an Italian study of 1757 patients found that the morbidity of EATL over 3 years fell from 6.42 to 0.22 in coeliac disease patients kept on a strict gluten-free diet. While two other studies found that the risk of malignancy in the diseases did not fall on this diet, current opinion strongly favors using it in all stages of coeliac disease.

== Management ==
=== Treatment of refractory celiac disease ===
Efforts have also been made to treat refractory celiac disease in order to prevent EATL. Treatment with corticosteroids, particularly budesonide gives temporary improvement in symptoms and histological responses in 30–40% of patients but few have attained a good overall response. The addition of azathioprine, cyclosporin, or a monoclonal antibody directed against tumor necrosis factor-α to the corticosteroid regimen, the use, as single agents, of purine analogs (i.e. pentostatin, cladribine) or monoclonal antibody directed against CD52 as well as the use of intensive chemotherapy regimens have shown little therapeutic effects. Furthermore, azathioprine, anti-CD52 antibody, and cladribine have been reported to increase the disease's progression to EATL. In summary, the role these drugs, intensive chemotherapy regimens, and hematopoietic stem cell transplantation in the treatment of refractory coeliac disease is unclear and has not been shown to improve, and in some cases may worsen, the chances that Type I and Type II RCD, will progress to EATL.

Patients with refractory coeliac disease, especially those with Type II RCD, should be examined at regular intervals for the development of EATL using magnetic resonance imaging, capsule endoscopy, CT scan, and Positron emission tomography;. These examinations should also be used whenever patients with refractory disease experience worsening symptoms.

=== Treatment of EATL ===
In eligible patients, surgery where necessary (required in >80% of patients) to repair obstructed or perforated bowel or remove bulky disease followed by a conditioning regimen of high-dose chemotherapy (usually the CHOP regimen or BV-CHP) and autologous stem cell transplantion has been the mainstay of treating EATL. Previous chemotherapy treatment regimens that did not use autologous stem cell transplantation reported poor prognoses with overall survival, progression free, and mortality rates over a 5-year period of 22%, 3%, and 81%. respectively whereas a regimen that included intensive chemotherapy, conditioning, and autologous stem cell transplantation had rates of 60%, 52%, and 39%, respectively.

== Research ==
=== Clinical trials ===
A phase 2 study sponsored by the Imagine Institute and being conducted in Paris, France is recruiting patients to examine the efficacy and side effects of a new treatment regimen on EATL. The regimen consists of treatment with brentuximab vedotin plus CHP (i.e. cyclophosphamide, Adriamycin, prednisone) followed by consolidation chemotherapy and autologous hematopoietic stem cell transplantation. Brentuximab vedotin is a chimeric monoclonal antibody that is complexed to the antimitotic agent, monomethyl auristatin E; the drug binds to the cell-membrane protein CD30 to deliver thereby the antimitotic aged into CD30-bearing target cells. This study is based on a phase 1 study finding that a regimen consisting of brentuximab vedotin plus CHP achieved objective responses in all 26 patients tested, with complete remissions obtained in the only patient with EATL, all 6 patients with ALCL, and 16 of 19 patients with other types of T-cell/NK-cell lymphomas.

A phase 1 study sponsored by the National Institutes of Health Clinical Center is recruiting patients that have CD30-expressing lymphomas such as EATL to examine the effects of a conditioning drug regimen (i.e. cyclophosphamide and fludarabine) followed by infusions of the patients' chimeric antigen receptor T cells that have been modified to target and destroy cells bearing CD30.

A phase 1 study sponsored by the NIH and Mayo Clinic USA is recruiting patients with peripheral T-cell lymphomas, including EATL, to study the efficacy and toxicity of nivolumab. Nivolumab is monoclonal antibody checkpoint inhibitor that binds to the programmed cell death protein 1 (PD-1) thereby blocking this protein from being activated by programmed death-ligand 1 (PD-L1). Many types of cancer cells increase their expression of PD-LI in order to inhibit immune cells that express PD-1 from killing them. Nivolumab blocks this inhibition and has been found effective in suppressing the growth of certain cancers.

A recently completed phase 2, randomized, double-blinded, placebo-controlled, parallel group study evaluated the efficacy and safety of a monoclonal antibody (termed AMG 714) directed against IL-15 in adult patients with Type II RCD. The study found potential therapeutic effects of the treatment in that it halted the malignant progression of IEL in these patients. Expanded access or compassionate use requests for AMG 714 may be considered for adult patients with biopsy-proven Type II RCD who have failed all available treatment options and do not have EATL. To request access, use Responsible Party contact information found by hitting the "More info..." linkage on the following clinical trials page.

== See also ==
- Lymphoma
- Mucosa-associated lymphoid tissue
