= Indolent T cell lymphoproliferative disorder of the gastrointestinal tract =

- Other names: Indolent lymphoma
- Specialty: Hematology and Oncology
- Symptoms: Common GI tract symptoms
- Causes: Growth of benign T cells
- Risk factors: May progress to a lymphoma
- Differential diagnosis: Mimics certain lymphomas
- Treatment: None except routine follow-ups to detect malignant progression
- Prognosis: Guarded

Indolent T cell lymphoproliferative disorder of the gastrointestinal tract or Indolent T cell lymphoproliferative disorder of the GI tract (ITCLD-GT) is a rare and recently recognized disorder in which mature T cell lymphocytes accumulation abnormally in the gastrointestinal tract (GI tract). This accumulation causes various lesions (e.g. polyps, thickened mucosal folds, small areas of redness, and superficial ulcerations) in the mucosal layer lining the GI tract. Individuals with ITCLD-GT commonly complain of chronic GI tract symptoms such as nausea, vomiting, diarrhea, abdominal pain, and rectal bleeding.

Carbonnell et al. first described a case of an indolent GI tract lymphoproliferation disorder in 1994 and defined the lymphocytes involved in it to be T cells expressing the CD4 glycoprotein on their surface membranes. Subsequent studies reported on patients who had a similar indolent GI tract disorder that involved T cells which expressed either the CD4, CD8, or neither surface membrane glycoprotein. The disorder resembled certain aggressive GI tract lymphomas and was variably termed indolent lymphoma or indolent T cell lymphoproliferative disorder of the gastrointestinal tract. However, the disease differed from the aggressive lymphomas which it mimicked in having a prolonged and usually non-progressive course. Furthermore, the disorder's lesions consisted of normal-appearing T cells that proliferated very slowly and usually caused little or no tissue destruction. In 2017, the World Health Organization provisionally classified ITCLD-GT as an extranodal (i.e. usually not involving lymph nodes), indolent disorder in which various subtypes of T cells proliferate in the GI tract.

While usually acting like a benign disease, ITCLD-GT has malignant features: 1) its normal-appearing T cells are clonal in nature, i.e. descended from a single cell; 2) these T cells may contain genetic abnormalities that are known to occur in and contribute to the development of very aggressive lymphomas; and 3) ITCLD-GI, after many years of indolent behavior, may progress to an aggressive lymphoma. Thus, ITCLD-GT can act as a premalignant disorder. Nonetheless, most cases of it run an indolent, non-malignant course and when mistakenly treated as an aggressive lymphoma, do not responded to standard chemotherapy treatments. The disorder has also been mistaken for, and found unresponsive to therapies that treat inflammatory or autoimmune bowel diseases. Clinically, ITCLD-GT must be distinguished from the malignant, inflammatory, and autoimmune bowel diseases that it mimics in order to avoid useless and potentially harmful therapies.

== Presentation ==
ITCLD-GT occurs more commonly in males of middle age (median age 48.4, range 15–77 years in one study). Individuals with the disease present with GI tract symptoms which often are serious and/or debilitating and may mimic those occurring in malignant lymphoproliferative, inflammatory, or autoimmune bowel diseases. These symptoms include chronic epigastric pain, abdominal pain, heartburn, nausea, diarrhea, vomiting, weight loss, relapsing oral ulcers, relapsing colorectal ulcers, rectal bleeding, and/or night sweats. Several patients presenting with these symptoms have been diagnosed with and unsuccessfully treated for peripheral T-cell lymphoma, an inflammatory bowel disease (either Crohn's disease or ulcerative colitis), or the autoimmune GI tract disorder, celiac disease. It has been shown or appears very likely that these patients had ITCLD-GT rather than the cited diagnoses.

== Natural course ==
Most patients with ITCLD-GT have chronic, relapsing and recurring GI tract symptoms that persist over many years. In one retrospective study, 19 of 23 patients with CD4+ ITCLD-GT had persistent disease over a follow-up period of 1–14 years (median 4.8 years), 2 of 23 patients had clinical and morphologic (i.e. negative GI tract evaluations) remissions enduring for at least 5–7 years, and 1 of 23 patients developed and died from a large-cell lymphoma of undetermined type. In the same study, 10 of 10 patients with CD8+ ITCLD-GT had persistent disease that had not progressed to a malignancy over an observation period of 1–18 years (median 2 years) although one patient had developed bone marrow involvement and therefore may have had disease which was in the process of transforming to a malignant state. Other reports have found that the disorder in one patient with CD4-, CD8- ITCLD-GT disease progressed to involve the liver and the disorder in two patients with CD4+ ITCLD-GT disease progressed to an undetermined type of large T-cell lymphoma. In another retrospective analysis, 6 of 34 (17.6%) patients with ITCLD-GT progressed to a malignant state as evidenced by its spread to the blood or bone marrow: 2 (5.6%) patients died as a direct result of this spreading.

== Pathophysiology ==
The lesions in ITCLD-GT consists of slowly growing, mature, and benign-appearing T cells. The reasons for their accumulations in the GI tract are unclear. However, these cells often carry potentially oncogenic mutations. In a recent study, the T cells in 4 of 5 patients with CD4+ T-cell disease carried a STAT3-JAK2 fusion gene. This gene consists of a fusion between the STAT3 gene at position 2.2 on the long (or "g") arm of chromosome 17 (location abbreviated 17q21.2) and the JAK2 gene at position 24.1 on the short ("q") of chromosome 9 (9p24.1). The disorder in two of the patients with this t(9;17)(p24.1;q21/2) fusion gene progressed to malignant lymphomas. Abnormalities in the expression and/or activity of STAT3 and JAK2 as well as various JAK2 fusion genes are associated with the development and progression of various myeloproliferative and lymphoproliferative malignancies. These findings suggest that the STAT3-JAK2-fusion gene may contribute to the malignant progression and perhaps development of CD4+ ITCLD-GT. Numerous other genetic abnormalities occur in the T-cells of ITCLD-GT but unlike the STAT3-JAK fusion gene have been limited to single cases. These abnormalities include trisomy of chromosome 5, a t(4;16)(q26;p13) fusion between interleukin-2 and B-cell maturation antigen genes, loses in the 4p26 and 16p13 chromosomal areas involved in formation of the t(4;16)9q26;p13) fusion gene, and one or more copy number variations in diverse areas of different chromosomes. The role(s), if any, of these abnormalities in ITCLD-GT is unclear.

=== T cells In ITCLD-GT ===
The cells involved in all cases of ITCLD-GT are mature T cells that exhibit a clonal rearrangement of their T-cell receptors and, therefore, are derived from a common ancestry cell. They express the αβ as opposed to the γδ surface membrane T-cell receptor and therefore are αβ rather than γδ T-cells. In all reported cases, these T cells express the CD3 cluster of differentiation protein complex but vary in their expression of the CD4 cluster of differentiation glycoprotein as well as the CD8 glycoprotein component of the T cell receptor. Individuals with ITCLD-GT, therefore, have pathological accumulations of either CD4+, CD8+, or, very rarely, CD4-, CD8- T cells. A single case of CD4+, CD8+ T cell disease has been reported recently. There may be differences in the presentation, course, and malignant potential of ITCLD-GT based or these different expressions of CD4 and CD8 but this requires further study. Unlike certain types of T cell lymphomas for which it has been mistaken, the T cells in ITCLD-GT do not express the neutral cell adhesion molecule, CD56, and are not infected with the Epstein–Barr virus and therefore do not express this virus's latency proteins or latency ncRNAs. The origin of these cells is unknown but it is thought that the CD4+ and CD8+ T-cells derive from mucosal T helper and cytotoxic T lymphocytes, respectively. The CD4-, CD8- T cells that may cause rare cases of the disorder exhibit cytology and morphology features of both of the latter two mucosal cell types.

== Histology ==
Histological analysis of tissues biopsied from the GI tract generally reveals dense infiltrates of small, mature lymphocytes in the mucosa that may displace but usually do not invade the epithelium; these cells sometimes extend through the muscularis mucosa to invade the submucosa. The lesions may contain reactive plasma cells, eosinophils, granulomas (in CD4+ disease), and lymphoid follicles. There is little or no tissue destruction. Immunohistochemistry analyses indicate that the small lymphocytes are CD4+, CD8+, CD4-/CD8-, or CD4+/CD8+ T-cells that stain for CD3 but not CD56 or Epstein-Barr virus products. Notably, the affected T cells have an extremely low rate of proliferation as determined by examining their KI-67 protein using immunofluorescence analysis.

== Diagnosis ==
The diagnosis of indolent T cell lymphoproliferative disorder of the GI tract depends on identifying the presentation, clinical course, and laboratory and histological findings given in the previous four sections. (Future studies may find that the diagnosis is supported by demonstrating the presence of the STAT3-JAK2 fusion gene in the CD4+ T cells of suspicious tissues.)

=== Laboratory studies ===
Inspection of the entire GI tract by endoscopy and colonoscopy generally finds mucosal redness, erosions, small superficial ulcerations, occasional small polyps, fissures, diverticula, and, rarely, tumor-like masses and deep ulcers. These lesions may be localized, occur in multiple sites, or extend throughout the GI tract; they are more common in the small intestine and colon but can also occur in the stomach, esophagus, oral cavity (e.g. palate), and rectum. Whole body computed tomography scans (i.e. CT scans) frequently find enlarged mesenteric lymph nodes (i.e. lymph nodes attached to the intestinal mesentery) and may show evidence of liver, spleen, and/or other organ involvement in cases which are advancing or have advanced to a malignant lymphoma. Positron emission tomography scans (i.e. PET scans) and positron emission tomography–computed tomography scans (i.e. PET-CT scans) likewise often show that the mesenteric lymph nodes in ITCLD-GT exhibit modestly increased metabolic or biochemical activity and, in cases of progressing or overt malignant disease, show increased activity in other organs. Inspection of patients' peripheral blood smearss and bone marrow tissues may identify excessive numbers of ITCLD-GT's T cells and thereby likewise indicate progressing or malignant disease.

=== Differential diagnosis ===
Because of the radical differences in their prognoses and treatments, ITCLD-GT should be distinguished from the malignant, inflammatory, autoimmune, and other diseases that it can mimic. Key findings that distinguish ITCLD-GT from the following major diseases which ITCLD-GT may mimic are:

- Extranodal NK/T-cell lymphoma, nasal type (ENKTCL-NT]: Unlike ITCLD-GT, ENKTCL-NT a) is an Epstein–Barr virus–associated lymphoproliferative disease that commonly involves midline areas of the nasal cavity, oral cavity, and pharynx but may involve the GI tract; b) is a malignant and aggressive disease when involving the GI tract in areas below pharynx; c) usually involves rapidly proliferating malignant NK rather than T cells; d) commonly causes tissue-destructive lesions that are spread through multiple layers of the GI tract; and e) has lesions consisting of rapidly proliferating lymphocytes which express Epstein-Barr virus products, CD56, and one or more of various specific genetic abnormalities (see Genetic abnormalities in ENKTCL-NT).
- Monomorphic epithelieotropic intestinal lymphoma (MEITL) (formerly termed Type II enteropathy-associate T-cell lymphoma): Unlike ITCLD-GT, MEITL a) is a highly aggressive lymphoma of the GI tract that usually takes a short, lethal course; b) has lesions in which rapidly proliferating T cells accumulate in the mucosa and epithelium of the GI tract; and c) involves T cells that are CD4-, CD56-, and MAKT+, often express the γδ rather than the αβ T cell receptor, and in rare cases are infected with, and express products made by, the Epstein-Barr virus.
- Peripheral T-cell lymphoma subtype peripheral T-cell lymphoma not otherwise specified (PTCL-NOS): Unlike ITCLD-GT, PTCL-NOS a) is a heterogenous disease that typically involves peripheral lymph nodes but only rarely develops in the GI tract and b) is characterized by the rapid proliferation of CD4+ T cells that overexpress either GATA3 or TBX21, have a wide range of characteristic genetic abnormalities (see genetic abnormalities in PTCL, NOS), and in ~30% of cases are infected with, and express products made by, the Epstein-Barr virus.
- Celiac disease: A high proportion of patients with CD4+ ITCLD-GT and rare cases of CD8+ ITCLD-GT have been misdiagnosed as having celiac disease. Unlike celiac disease, ITCLD-GT: a) is unresponsive to gluten-free diets: b) is negative for antigens detected in standard celiac disease serology blood tests such as anti-transglutaminase antibodies; c) has infiltrating clonal T cells which do not express HLA-DQ2 or HLA-DQ8 human leukocyte antigens; and d) have lesions populated by mature, slowly proliferating clonal T cells which are CD56- and either CD4+, CD8+, CD4+/CD8+, or CD4-/CD8-. However, rare patients have been inflicted with both celiac disease and ITCLD-GT.
- Crohn's disease: Crohn's disease has been diagnosed in cases which were later diagnosed as ITCLD-GT perhaps because some patients with ITCLD-GT have histopathologic features (particularly the presence of granulomas)) that are characteristic of Crohn's disease. Awareness of ITCLD-GT and the histologic, clinical, and endoscopic differences between it and Crohn's disease should point to the proper diagnosis.
- Ulcerative colitis: Rare wcases of ITCLD-GT appear to have been diagnosed as ulcerative colitis. Awareness of ITCLD-GT and the histologic, clinical, and endoscopic differences between it and ulcerative colitis should point to the proper diagnosis.
- Natural killer cell enteropathy (NKCE): NKCE is an indolent disease in which lymphocytes proliferate in the GI tract to cause lesions and symptoms that resemble ITCLD-GT. NKCE differs from ITCLD-GT in that it: a) involves the proliferation of non-clonal NK cell rather than T cell lymphocytes; b) does now show evidence of mesenteric lymph node or other organ involvement; and c) does not progress to a malignant disease.

== Treatment ==
Studies indicate that patients with ITCLD-GT should be treated conservatively. Chemotherapy regimens directed at malignant lymphoma and treatment regimens used to treat celiac disease, Crohn's disease, or ulcerative colitis have had little or no beneficial effects on the course of the disease. Patients should be follow regularly with peripheral blood and bone marrow examinations, GI tract endoscopic examinations and PET scans in order to detect the progression of ITCLD-GT to a malignant phase.

== Prognosis ==
Studies to date indicate that most patients experience a prolonged course of persistent or recovering-relapsing GI tract symptoms. A small percentage of patients have had spontaneous and sustained recoveries or progressed to a malignant lymphoma.
