= Aggressive NK-cell leukemia =

- Other names: NK-cell large granular lymphocyte leukemia
- NK cell
- Specialty: Hematology and oncology

Aggressive NK-cell leukemia is a disease with an aggressive, systemic proliferation of natural killer cells (NK cells) and a rapidly declining clinical course.

It is also called aggressive NK-cell lymphoma.

== Signs and symptoms ==
Patients usually present with constitutional symptoms (malaise, weight loss, fatigue), and hepatosplenomegaly is commonly found on physical exam. Lymphadenopathy is also found to a lesser extent. Due to the aggressive nature of the disease, patients may initially present at a more advanced stage, with coagulopathies, hemophagocytic syndrome, and multi-organ failure. Rarely, individuals who have an aggressive NK cell lymphoma that is associated with latent infection with the Epstein–Barr virus (see next section) present with or develop extensive allergic reactions to mosquito bites. The symptoms of these reactions range from a greatly enlarged bite site that may be painful and involve necrosis to systemic symptoms (e.g. fever, swollen lymph nodes, abdominal pain, and diarrhea), or, in extremely rare cases, to life-threatening anaphylaxis.

== Cause ==
This disease has a strong association with the Epstein–Barr virus (EBV), but the true pathogenesis of this disease has yet to be described. The cell of origin is believed to be an NK cell. Blastoid NK cell lymphoma appears to be a different entity and shows no association with EBV.

=== Sites of involvement ===
This disease is typically found and diagnosed in peripheral blood, and while it can involve any organ, it is usually found in the spleen, liver, and bone marrow.

== Diagnosis ==
Leukemic cells are invariably present in samples of peripheral blood to a variable extent. Pancytopenia (anemia, neutropenia, thrombocytopenia) is commonly seen as well.

=== Peripheral blood ===
The leukemic cells have a diameter mildly greater than a large granular lymphocyte (LGL) and have azurophilic granules and nucleoli of varying prominence. Nuclei may be irregular and hyperchromatic.

=== Bone marrow ===
Bone marrow involvement runs the spectrum between an inconspicuous infiltrate to extensive marrow replacement by leukemic cells. Reactive histiocytes displaying hemophagocytosis can be seen interspersed in the neoplastic infiltrate.

=== Other organs ===
Leukemic involvement of organs is typically destructive on tissue sections with necrosis and possibly angioinvasion, and the monotonous infiltrate may be diffuse or patchy.

=== Immunophenotype ===
The immunophenotype of this disease is the same as extranodal NK/T-cell lymphoma, nasal type and is shown in the table below. CD11b and CD16 show variable expression.

Status	Antigens
Positive	CD2, CD3ε, CD56, perforin, granzyme B, TIA-1, CCR5
Negative	CD57

=== Genetic findings ===
Due to the NK lineage, clonal rearrangements of lymphoid (T cell receptor; B cell receptor) genes are not seen. The genome of the Epstein Barr virus (EBV) is detected in many cases, along with a variety of chromosomal abnormalities.

== Treatment ==
Pralatrexate (sold as Folotyn) was approved by the FDA in 2009 as the first treatment for PTCL.

== Epidemiology ==
This rare form of leukemia is more common among Asians in comparison to other ethnic groups. It is typically diagnosed in adolescents and young adults, with a slight predominance in males.
