= Hepatosplenic T-cell lymphoma =

- Other names: hepatosplenic γδ T-cell lymphoma
- Specialty: Hematology and oncology

Hepatosplenic T-cell lymphoma is a rare form of lymphoma that is generally incurable, except in the case of an allogeneic stem cell transplant. It is a systemic neoplasm comprising medium-sized cytotoxic T-cells that show significant sinusoidal infiltration in the liver, spleen, and bone marrow.

== Signs and symptoms ==
The typical clinical finding in a patient with hepatosplenic T-cell lymphoma is hepatosplenomegaly.The spleen and liver are always involved, and bone marrow involvement is common. Nodal involvement is exceedingly rare.

== Cause ==
The cell of origin for this disease is an immature cytotoxic T-cell clonally expressing the γδ T-cell receptor. The disease is seen more often in immunosuppressed recipients of solid organ transplants, an association that has led to the hypothesis that long-term immune stimulation in the setting of immunosuppression is the causative agent.

Cases of hepatosplenic T-cell lymphoma have been reported in patients treated with the immunosuppressants azathioprine, infliximab, and adalimumab. The majority of cases occurred in patients with inflammatory bowel disease. Adolescents and young adult males were most frequently affected. They presented with a very aggressive disease course, and all but one died. The Food and Drug Administration required changes to the drugs' labeling to inform users and clinicians of the risk.

== Diagnosis ==
The neoplastic cells in hepatosplenic T-cell lymphoma show a monotonous appearance, with a small amount of cytoplasm and inconspicuous nucleoli.

=== Laboratory findings ===
The constellation of thrombocytopenia, anemia, and leukopenia is common in patients with hepatosplenic T-cell lymphoma.

=== Spleen and liver ===
The disease shows a distinct sinusoidal pattern of infiltration which spares the splenic white pulp and hepatic portal triads.

=== Bone marrow ===
While the bone marrow is commonly involved, the detection of the neoplastic infiltrate may be difficult due to a diffuse, interstitial pattern. Immunohistochemistry can aid in diagnosis.

=== Peripheral blood ===
Cells of a similar morphology observed in solid organs are observed in peripheral blood.

=== Immunophenotype ===
The immunophenotype for hepatosplenic T-cell lymphoma is a post-thymic, immature T-cell.

Status	Antigens
Positive	CD3, TCRδ1, TIA-1
Negative	CD4, CD5, CD8

=== Genetic findings ===
Clonal rearrangement of the γ gene of the T-cell receptor is the hallmark of hepatosplenic T-cell lymphoma. A few cases have shown rearrangement of the T-cell receptor β gene. Isochromosome 7q has been observed in all cases described so far, sometimes in conjunction with other chromosomal abnormalities such as trisomy 8.

== Treatment ==
The CHOP chemotherapy regimen frequently induces remission but has proven weak compared to treatments that integrate cytarabine, with Hyper-CVAD being particularly effective. When treated solely with chemotherapy, most patients relapse and die within two years. Treatment solely with doxorubicin can make the disease worse.Allogeneic bone marrow transplantation has been shown to induce remission for more than five years and possibly cure hepatosplenic lymphoma. Autologous bone marrow transplantation is currently being investigated.

== Epidemiology ==
Hepatosplenic lymphoma is rare, comprising less than 5% of all lymphoma cases, and is most common in young adults and adolescents. A distinct male gender preference has been described.

== See also ==
- List of hematologic conditions
