= Peripheral T-cell lymphoma =

- Specialty: Oncology

Peripheral T-cell lymphoma is a group of T-cell lymphomas that develop away from the thymus or bone marrow.

Examples include:

- Cutaneous T-cell lymphomas
- Angioimmunoblastic T-cell lymphoma
- Extranodal natural killer/T-cell lymphoma, nasal type
- Enteropathy type T-cell lymphoma
- Subcutaneous panniculitis-like T-cell lymphoma
- Anaplastic large cell lymphoma
- Peripheral T-cell lymphoma not otherwise specified

In ICD-10, cutaneous T-cell lymphomas are classified separately.
