= Extranodal NK/T-cell lymphoma, nasal type =

Extranodal NK-T-cell lymphoma
- Other names: Angiocentric lymphoma, Nasal-type NK lymphoma, NK/T-cell lymphoma, Polymorphic/malignant midline reticulosis
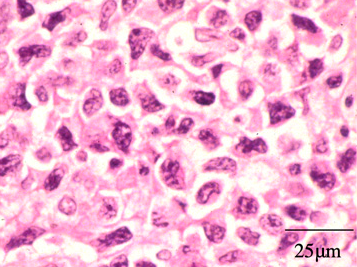
- Histopathology of extranodal NK-T cell lymphoma, nasal type (H&E stain). These lymphoma cells are typically monotonous, with folded nuclei, indistinct nucleoli and moderate amount of cytoplasm.
- Specialty: Hematology and Oncology
- Causes: Epstein–Barr virus

Extranodal NK/T-cell lymphoma, nasal type (ENKTCL-NT) (also termed angiocentric lymphoma, nasal-type NK lymphoma, NK/T-cell lymphoma, polymorphic/malignant midline reticulosis, and lethal midline granuloma) is a rare type of lymphoma that commonly involves midline areas of the nasal cavity, oral cavity, and/or pharynx. At these sites, the disease often takes the form of massive, necrotic, and extremely disfiguring lesions. However, ENKTCL-NT can also involve the eye, larynx, lung, gastrointestinal tract, skin, and various other tissues. ENKTCL-NT mainly affects adults; it is relatively common in Asia and to lesser extents Mexico, Central America, and South America but is rare in Europe and North America. In Korea, ENKTCL-NT often involves the skin and is reported to be the most common form of cutaneous lymphoma after mycosis fungoides.

ENKTCL-NT is classified as an Epstein–Barr virus-associated lymphoproliferative disease. It is due to the malignant transformation of either one of two types of lymphocytes, NK cells or a T cell variant termed cytotoxic T cells, that are infected with the Epstein–Barr virus (EBV). Typically, the viral infection, which affects >90% of the world population, occurs years before evidence of ENKTCL-NT, is carried in cells in a latent, asymptomatic form, and for unclear reasons becomes active in causing the disease. Following the virus's activation, the infected cells acquire numerous genetic abnormalities which may play an important role in the development and/or progression of ENKTCL-NT.

Epstein–Barr virus-positive nodal NK/T cell lymphoma (EBV+ nodal NKTCL) was considered to be one form of ENKTCL-NT since it is a malignancy of EBV-infected NK or T cells. However, EBV+ nodal NKTCL is manifested primarily by its involvement in lymph nodes; it also has clinical, pathological, pathophysiological, and genetic features that differ significantly from those of ENKTCL-NT. The World Health Organization, 2016, therefore reclassified this lymphoma as a variant of a disease to which its features more closely resemble, peripheral T-cell lymphoma not otherwise specified.

While a rare disease, particularly in North America, ENKTCL-NT has recently gained much interest. Clinical studies have found that newer chemotherapeutic regimens greatly improved survival in cases of early disease. While, survival in advanced cases is still extremely poor, generally being only a few months, recent studies suggest that new regimens directed at gene mutation and expression abnormalities may improve survival. Further study of these new regimens has important implications not only for ENKTCL-NT but also for other NK/T cell malignancies.

== Presentation ==
Extranodal NK/T-cell lymphoma, nasal type occurs primarily in Asians and South Americans; it is comparatively uncommon in other areas. Affected patients (median age 50–60 years old; males predominate) most often (~80% of cases) present with nasal bleeding, upper airway obstruction, perforation of the hard palate, and/or disfiguring, necrotic lesions of the nasal cavity, nasopharynx (including Waldeyer's tonsillar ring), paranasal sinuses, palate, and/or eye socket. Less often, patients present with these findings plus signs and symptoms involving extranasal sites such as the skin, upper respiratory tract, gastrointestinal tract, uterus, testes, and/or elsewhere. Rarely, individuals present with evidence of involvement in the later sites without those involving the head/neck area. On further study these individuals may be found to have occult involvement in the head and neck or to develop such involvement. However, ~10% of patients present with only skin lesions such as a solitary or multiple subcutaneous masses (which may be ulcerated) in the arms or legs while another ~10% present with masses in the lower gastrointestinal tract (which may be accompanied by bleeding or obstruction), salivary glands, testes, muscles, or other organs without evidence of lesions in the head/neck areas. In these cases, there is relatively little involvement of lymph nodes except as a result of direct invasion from non-nodal sites. Thirty-five to forty-five percent of patients present with a history of malaise, fever, night sweats, and/or weight loss. Most (70–75%) patients are diagnosed with early stage I or II disease while the rest have far more serious stage III or IV disease. Rarely, patients with stage III or IV disease have evidence of a life-threatening complication, hemophagocytic lymphohistiocytosis. Also in rare cases, patients evidence a widespread disease that includes malignant cell infiltrations in the liver, spleen, lymph nodes, bone marrow, and/or blood. These case are, or may soon progress to, a related but potentially fatal disease, aggressive NK-cell leukemia.

About 45% of patients present with elevated levels of serum lactate dehydrogenase; elevation in this serum enzyme is a poor prognostic indicator. Patients with ENKTCL-NT also have elevated levels of plasma EBV DNA. Quantification of these levels at diagnosis correlates with the extent of their tumor load while serially assaying these levels during treatment gives evidence of the tumors response to treatment and residual disease. Rarely, patients show laboratory evidence of hemophagocytic lymphohistiocytosis such as: decreased circulating red blood cells, leukocytes, and/or platelets; increased serum levels of liver-derived enzymes, ferritin, and/or triglycerides; decreased serum levels of fibrinogen; and/or hemophagocytosis, i.e. engulfment of blood cells by tissue histiocytes in the liver, spleen, bone morrow, and/or other tissues. or aggressive NK-cell leukemia (e.g. decreased circulating red blood cells, leukocytes, and/or platelets, increased circulating large, granule-containing malignant NK cells, and infiltrations of the latter cells in bone marrow and other tissues).

== Pathogenesis ==
=== Disease location ===
ENKTCL-NT is a disease of malignant NK or, very much less often, cytotoxic T cells. Unlike most other lymphomas, which typically develop in and involve lymphatic tissues (particularly lymph nodes and spleen), ENKTCL-NT commonly develops in non-lymphatic tissues. This difference in distribution probably reflects the occupancy of the T cell and B cell precursors to most lymphomas in lymphatic tissues versus the frequent occupancy of the NK and cytotoxic T cells precursors to ENTCL-NT in non-lymphatic tissues.

=== Genes ===
ENKTCL-NT is thought to arise from the expression of EBV genes in the infected NK or cytotoxic T cells and the ability of these genes to cause the cells they infect to overexpress and acquire mutations in key genes that regulate cell growth, immortalization, invasiveness, and ability to evade normal control mechanisms, particularly immune surveillance. Since these gene-related abnormalities are multiple and vary between patients, it is not clear which contribute to the development and/or progression of ENKTCL-NT. Clinical studies are therefore examining targeted therapy tactics to determine which gene abnormalities contribute to, and which drugs targeting these abnormalities are useful in treating, ENKTCL-NT.

==== EBV genes ====
Infected cells carry ~10 cytosolic EBV episomes, i.e. gene-bearing viral DNA particles. In the premalignant precursor NK and cytotoxic T cells of ENKTCL-NT, these episomes express only some of their many latency genes, i.e. genes which promote the virus's latency rather than lytic phase of infectivity. EBV has three different latency phases, I, II, and III, in each of which different sets of latency genes are expressed to establish different controls on the cells which they infect. In the premalignant cells of ENKTCL-NT, EBV express latency II genes such as EBNA-1, LMP-1, LMP-2A, and LMP-2B protein-producing genes; EBER-1 and EBER-2 non-coding RNA-producing genes (see EBV non-coding RNAs); and certain BART microRNA-producing genes (see EBV microRNAs). LMP1 protein induces infected cells to overexpress genes that produce cMyc, NF-κB, and BCL2 proteins which when overexpressed block these cells' apoptosis (i.e. cell death) response to injury or the host's immune system and promote their survival and proliferation; LMP2A and LMP2B proteins induce infected cells to overexpress the genes that make AKT and B cell receptor proteins and to activate the NF-κ pathway which when over-activated blocks these cells' apoptosis response and promotes their survival and proliferation; EBER 1 and 2 non-coding RNAs induce infected cells to overexpress the gene that makes the interleukin 10 protein which when overexpressed may promote its parent cells to proliferate and avoid the host's immune system; and certain BART microRNAs may help infected cells avoid attack by the hosts immune system and modify their notch signaling pathway thereby promoting their proliferation. In consequence, the EBV latency II genes force infected cells to become immortal, proliferate excessively, invade tissues, and avoid attack by the hosts' immune system. Due at least in part to these imposed factors, the infected cells may acquire other genetic abnormalities that further promote their malignant behavior.

==== Infected cell genes ====
The rapidly proliferating and immortalized EBV-infected NK/T cells accumulate numerous changes in the expression or activity of their genes by acquisition of chromosome deletions, gene mutations, and changes in gene expression.

===== Chromosomes =====
Deletions in the long (i.e. "q") arm at position 21–25 (notated as 6q21–25) from one of the two chromosome 6's was an early finding in occasional cases of ENKTCL-NT. This deletion removes one of the two copies of several tumor suppressor genes (i.e. genes that protect cells from becoming malignant) such as HACE1, PRDM1, FOXO3, and PTPRK. Subsequent studies showed that the disease is also occasionally associated with losses in the short arm of chromosome 8 at position 11.23 (8p11.23) which for unclear reasons are associated with a poor prognosis, and occasional losses at position 11l.2 in the q arm of chromosome 14 (14q11.2) which correlates with the ENKTCL-NT malignancy being of cytotoxic T cell origin. EBV-infected NK and T cells may also occasionally develop chromosome segregation errors during mitosis and consequently divide into daughter cells which possess too few or too many chromosomes and thereby exhibit chaotic losses or increases in the expression of the genes located on these chromosomes.

===== Mutated genes =====
Second generation sequencing methods have uncovered numerous genes which are mutated in the malignant cells of ENKTCL-NT. These mutated genes and their product proteins have the following a) mutation rates in ENKTCL-NT; b) normal functions; c) gains or losses of activity; d) pro-malignant effects on EN/T cells and e) clinical impacts on the course of ENKTCL-NT:

Gene	Product	Mutation rate	Function	Mutation type	Influence on cell function	Clinical impact on ENKTCL-NT
TP53	p53	13–62%	tumor suppressor	gain	promotes cell proliferation, survival, migration, invasiveness, and metastasis	correlates with advanced stage and poor prognosis
DDX3X	DDX3X	12–20%	tumor suppressor	loss	lost ability to inhibit proliferation	correlates with advanced stage and poor prognosis
STAT3	STAT3	8–26%	JAK-STAT signaling pathway component	gain	promotes cell proliferation and survival	unknown
STAT5B	STAT5B	~2–6%	JAK-STAT signaling pathway component	gain	promotes cell proliferation and survival	unknown
JAK3	JAK3	0–35%	JAK-STAT signaling pathway component	gain	promotes cell proliferation and survival	unknown
MGA	MAX dimerization protein	~8%	tumor suppressor	loss	unknown	unknown
MLL2	MLL2	7–80%	histone methyltransferase, tumor suppressor	loss	reduces cellular differentiation, possibly promoting cell proliferation and survival	unknown
BCOR	BCL-6 corepressor	21–32%	inhibits BCL-5, may regulate apoptosis	loss	may increase cell survival	unknown
ECSIT	ECSIT	19%	element in TGF-β/BMP/signaling pathways	gain	activates NF-κB to promote cell survival and prolifaration	correlates with advanced stage and poor prognosis
ARID1A	ARID1A	4–8%	a SWI/SNF protein that regulates expression of other proteins	loss	unknown	unknown
MCL1	MCL1	most cases	a SWI/SNF protein that regulates expression of other proteins	loss	unknown	unknown

In the above table, ARID1A protein stands for AT-rich interactive domain-containing protein 1A and ECSIT protein stands for evolutionarily conserved signaling intermediate in Toll pathway; mitochondrial. A gain of function mutation in the ECSIT gene that changes the amino acid at the 140 position in its product protein from valine to alanine (i.e. V140A) is associated with a high incidence of ENKTCL-NT being complicated by the development of life-threatening Hemophagocytic lymphohistiocytosis and thereby a relatively high mortality rate. Numerous other genes are rarely (i.e. ≤2% of cases) mutated in ENKTCL-NT. These include JAK1, MLL3, ARID1A, EP300, ASXL3, MSN, FAT4, NARS, IL6R, MGAM, CHPF2, (see) and MIR17HG ((see).

===== Overexpressed genes =====
ENKTCL-NT malignant cells overexpress NF-κB, a cellular signaling transcription factor that when up-regulated promotes these cells' proliferation and survival. They also overexpress: 1) aurora kinase A, a serine/threonine-specific protein kinase that when up-regulated in the cancer setting promotes these cells' invasiveness and to develop chromosome segregation errors during mitosis that result in daughter cells having too few or too many chromosome; 2) members of the inhibitor of apoptosis family of proteins including survivin, Bcl-xL, and MCL1 which when up-regulated suppress programmed cell death to promote these cell's survival and resistance to attack by the host immune system; 3) multidrug resistance protein 1, a surface membrane protein that when up-regulated causes these cells to greatly increases the export of anthracyclines such as Adriamycin and Daunomycin thereby rendering them resistant to this class of chemotherapy drugs; 4) EZH2, a histone methyltransferase that when up-regulated indirectly promotes these cells' growth; 5) runt-related transcription factor 3 that when up-regulated indirectly promotes the survival and proliferation of these cells; and 6) programmed death-ligand 1 (PD-L1), that when up-regulated increases the ability of these cells to avoid attack by the host's immune system.

=== Signaling pathways ===
In consequence of, or addition to the cited genetic abnormalities, ENKTCL-NT malignant cells have overly active the; JAK-STAT signaling pathway that in the cancer setting promotes cell proliferation, survival, and other pro-malignant behaviors; platelet-derived growth factor signaling pathway that in the cancer setting promotes cell survival and proliferation; Notch signaling pathway that in the cancer setting promotes cellular differentiation and proliferation; and NF-κB signaling that in the cancer setting promotes cell survival and proliferation. Studies suggest that overactive VEGF receptor and Protein kinase B signaling pathways may also play a role in the pathogenesis of ENKTCL-NT.)

=== Epigenetic abnormalities ===
Studies on cultured malignant NK cells and/or patient tissue specimens find that numerous genes are hypermethylated at their promoter sites and therefore are silenced, i.e. make less or none of their protein products. This silencing has been detected in numerous proteins expressed by cultured NK cells (e.g. BCL2L11, DAPK1, PTPN6, TET2, SOCS6, PRDM1, AIM1, HACE, p15, p16, p73, MLH1, RARB, and ASNS) and the MIR146A gene for its miR-146a microRNA product. Studies conducted on the expression of microRNAs in cultured malignant NK cells have also revealed that many are either over- or under-expressed compared to non-malignant cultured NK cells. This dysregulation of these microRNA genes may reflect the action of products expressed by certain EBV genes and/or the overexpression of the infected cells' MYC gene. In all cases, the epigenetic dysregulation of these genes requires further study to determine its significance for the development and progression of ENKTCL-NT.

== Histology ==
On microscopic examination, involved tissues show commonly show areas of necrosis and cellular infiltrates that are centered around and often injure or destroy small blood vessels. The infiltrates contain large granule-containing lymphocytes that express cell surface CD2, cytoplasmic CD3ε, and cell surface CD56 as well the cytoplasmic intracellular proteins, perforin, granzyme B, and T cell intracellular antigen-1 (TIA-1). These cells exhibit evidence of EBV infection as determined by in situ hybridization assays to detect one of the virus's latent products, typically EBER-1/2 micoRNAs. Identification of the genetic abnormalities cited above in the cells may be of help in establishing the diagnoses and be of use for selecting novel therapeutic approaches to individual patients. Non-malignant inflammatory white blood cells, including eosinophils, are also commonly found in these infiltrates.

== Diagnosis ==
The diagnosis of ENKTCL-NT depends on histological findings that biopsied tissue infiltrates contain lymphocytes that express CD3ε, cytotoxic molecules (granzyme B, perforin, TIA1), and EBV. Bone marrow examination is recommended to determine its involvement in this disorder. Whole body PET-CT scans are recommended to determine the extent of disease at presentation as well as to follow the effects of therapeutic interventions. The tumor load of each individual's disease as well as response to therapies has also been estimated by assaying plasma levels of EBV DNA. ENKTCL-NT can be mimicked by two benign diseases which involve the excessive proliferation of non-malignant NK cells in the GI tract viz., Natural killer cell enteropathy, a disease wherein NK cell infiltrative lesions occur in the intestine, colon, stomach, and/or esophagus, and lymphomatoid gastropathy, a disease wherein these cells infiltrative lesions are limited to the stomach. Another lymphoproliferative disorder of the GI tract, indolent T cell lymphoproliferative disorder of the gastrointestinal tract may also mimic ENKTCL-NT. This chronic disorder involves the proliferation of CD+4, CD8+, CD4-/CD8-, or CD4+/CD8+ T cells in the mucosal layers of the GI tract to give a variety of GI tract symptoms. While generally a persistent and benign disorder, a small but significant percentage of cases have progressed to aggressive lymphomas. The disease may be incidentally diagnosed upon histopathology os sinus contents removed from sinusitis surgery.

== Course of ENKTCL-NT ==
The course of the untreated disease is heavily dependent on its clinical stage at diagnosis. Patients presenting with highly localized stage I nasal disease usually have nasal but no other symptoms; these individuals commonly show no progression of their disease over long periods of time. Other patients with limited (i.e. stage I or II) disease involving other sites in the head area are more likely to have a relatively slow progression of their disease while patients with stage III or IV disease have a more rapidly progressive disease with a poor prognosis. Patients presenting with ENKTCL-NT that does not involve the head area typically have a disseminated and aggressively progressive disease with a very poor prognosis. Patients with stage I or II localized disease that have been treated with the recently defined chemotherapeutic protocols have 5 year survivals of ~70–89% while those with advanced stage III or IV disseminated disease treated with these protocols have 5 year survivals of 50%. Patients who relapse or are resistant to these protocols have had overall survivals of just a few months.

Three prognostic models, NK-PI, PINK (i.e. prognostic index of natural killer lymphomas), and PINK-E) for ENKTCL-NT have evolved over the past 12 years. The latest model, PINK-E, which applies to patients treated with recently defined regimens, lists 5 risk factors (age >60, state III or IV disease, no nasal involvement, distant lymph node involvement, and detectable blood levels of EBV DNA) to define patients as low, intermediate, and high risk based on their having 0–1, 2, or 3–5 risk factors, respectively. Overall 3 year survival in these 3 respective groups were 81, 55, and 28%. Patients, particularly those in the advanced poor risk groups may develop hemophagocytic lymphohistiocytosis or have their disease progress to aggressive NK-cell leukemia. Both conditions are life-threatening and far less responsive to treatment.

== Treatment ==
The treatment of ENKTCL- NT employs chemotherapy plus, where indicated, radiotherapy. Early chemotherapies relied on CHOP (i.e. cyclophosphamide, an anthracycline (primarily adriamycin), vincristine, and prednisolone) or chop-like regimens. These were only marginally successful because, as it was later discovered, the malignant NK cells in ENKTCL-NT over-express multidrug resistance protein 1. This protein exports various molecules, including anthracyclines and vincristine, from its parent cells and thereby renders these cells resistant to adriamycin and vincristine and therefore to CHOP and CHOP-like regimens. Subsequent studies discovered that L-asparaginase (NK cells do not express L-asaraginase) and, to a lesser extent, platinum-based antineoplastic drugs (e.g.carboplatin) were active on theses cells. Accordingly, several chemotherapeutic regimens were tested and found to give much better results than previous regimens. Both these regimens have undergone phase 3 clinical trials that examine their effectiveness relative to other regimens. The following regimens are recommended by many studies and the European Society for Medical Oncology Clinical Practice guidelines or National Comprehensive Cancer Network:

- Localized stage I and 2 diseases are treated with a combination of local radiation followed by DeVIC (dexamethasone, etoposide, ifosfamide, and carboplatin). Five-year progression-free and overall survival rates with this regimen are 70–72% and 61–63%, respectively. An alternative regimen, termed CCRT-VIDL, combines cisplatin plus radiation followed by etoposide, ifosfamide, cisplatin, and dexamethasone to give complete response and 5 overall survival rates of 87 and 73%, respectively.
  - Patients who have a partial response or relapse on this regimen are treated with the SMILE regimen (see below).
- Disseminated stage III and IV disease are treated with SMILE, i.e. dexamethasone, methotrexate, ifosfamide, L-asparaginase, and etoposide. The regimen obtains complete response and 5 year overall survival rates of 45 and 47%, respectively. In the United States, Pegaspargase is used in place of L-asparaginase.
  - Patients that have a complete or partial response to this regimen may then treated with an autologous stem-cell transplantation regimen, palliative chemotherapy, and/or experimental drugs.

=== Experimental drugs ===
There are numerous regimens that use non-chemotherapeutic agents to target specific elements known or thought to be involved in the survival of the malignant cells in a significant percentage of ENKTCL-NT cases. The targets should be determined as overexpressed or present in the malignant tissues of each case before treatment. The targets, therapeutic agents, and some phase 1 clinical trials (testing for appropriate dosages, safety, and side effects) and/or phase 2 clinical trials (testing for efficacy and safety) include:

- PD1: Program death-ligand 1 (PD-L1) is commonly overexpressed in ENKTCL-NT as an apparent result of EBV infection. Pembrolizumab and Nivolumab are monoclonal antibody preparations that bind to the programmed cell death 1 receptor on lymphocytes thereby blocking the action of PD-L1 in suppressing the anti-cancer actions of these cells. Seven patients with refractory or relapsed ENKTCL-NT had either complete (5 patients) or partial (2 patients) responses to Pembrolizumab and three patients with relapsed ENKTCL-NT had had either complete (2 patients) or partial (1 patient) responses to Nivolumab. A clinical study sponsored by the Memorial Sloan Kettering Cancer Center in New York City is recruiting individuals to study the effects of Pembrolizumab in patients with early-stage ENKTCL-NT; a phase I/II clinical study sponsored by the Abramson Cancer Center of the University of Pennsylvania in Philadelphia is recruiting individuals to examine the effects of Pembrolizumab in individuals with relapsed or refractory ENKTCL-NA; and a clinical phase 2 study sponsored by the University of Hong Kong is recruiting individuals to examine the effects of Pembrolizmab on ENKTCL-NT.
- CD30: The malignant cells in ~40% of ENKTCL-NT cases express the surface membrane protein, CD30. Two case reports have indicated that the CD30-targeted monoclonal antibody, which is conjugated to the cytoxic/antineoplastic agent auristatin E, brentuximab vedotin, was helpful in treating relapsed ENKTCL-NT. A not-yet-recruiting study estimated to be finished by Sept., 2018 examines the effects of brentuximab vedotin on EBV-positive, CD30-positive lymphomas.
- CD38: CD38 is almost always expressed in the malignant cells of ENkTCL-NT. One patient with this disease, after relapsing following each of two chemotherapy courses, had a complete remission when treated with a cytotoxic antibody directed at CD38, Daratumumab. A phase 2 clinical study on the effects of Daratumumab on ENTCL-NT sponsored by Janssen Research & Development, LLC is recruiting patients in China, South Korea, and Taiwan.
- EBV antigens: EBV-infected cells express the viral LMP1 and LMP2 proteins on their surface membranes and therefore are potential targets for attack by cytotoxic T cells (CTL). Studies have used CTL that have been engineered to attack and kill LMP1 and/or LMP2 expressing cells. Eleven patients with refractory or relapsed ENKTCL-NT were treated with their own CTL that had been engineered to kill LMP1/2-expressing cells. Nine patients had durable (>4 years) remissions, 1 patient had a complete remission which lasted only 9 months, and 2 patients show no response to the treatment. In a second study, 8 patients with localized and two with advanced disease who were in complete remission after chemotherapy (with or without radiation treatment) were given their own CTL that had been engineered to kill LMP1/2-bearing cells. One patient relapsed after 32 months while the remaining 7 patients had progression-free and overall survivals of 100 and 90%, respectively. A phase I clinical trial sponsored by Baylor College of Medicine, the Center for Cell and Gene Therapy, Baylor College of Medicine, Texas Children's Hospital, and the Methodist Hospital System is recruiting individuals to test the effects of donor CTL engineered to kill cells bearing LMP1/2, ARF, and/or EBNA-1 viral antigens; the PI is Rayne Rouce. A phase 2 clinical study sponsored by ViGenCell Inc. is being conducted at the Catholic University of Korea to test the effects of CTL engineered to kill EBV-infected cells on patients that are in complete remission following chemotherapy (±radiation treatment) but at high risk for recurrent disease. Patients will receive the CTL or placebo (i.e. peripheral blood mononuclear cells). The study, which begins recruitment in late Feb., 2019, seeks to determine if the CTL treatment prolongs remissions.
- Bcl-2 proteins: Bcl-2 proteins are a family of proteins that regulate cellular apoptosis. Venetoclax (also termed ABT-199) is a small-molecule drug that indirectly promotes the activation of two apoptosis-inducing proteins, Bcl-2-associated X protein and Bcl-2 homologous antagonist killer thereby promoting cell death. It is approved for the treatment of chronic lymphocytic leukemia. Venetoclax is currently recruiting patients for a phase 2 clinical trial sponsored by the City of Hope Medical Center and the National Cancer Institute to evaluate its effects on refractory and recurrent ENKTCL-NT.

Small molecule inhibitors of JAK3 (e.g. tofacitinib), JAK1/JAK2 (e.g. AZD1480), STAT3 (e.g. WP1066), and DDX3X (e.g. RK-33) are being study in pre-clinical in vitro experiments as potential inhibitors of malignant NK/T cell proliferation and survival. They are in further studies to test them as potential therapeutic agents in ENKTCL-NT patients that have activating mutations or overexpression of the cited targets.

== See also ==
- Cutaneous T-cell lymphoma
- Subcutaneous T-cell lymphoma
- List of cutaneous conditions
- Epstein–Barr virus–associated lymphoproliferative diseases
