= Rayne Rouce =

American physician scientist and rapper

Rayne Rouce is an American pediatric hematologist-oncologist, physician scientist, and community leader who has authored over 200 original songs.

== Early life and education ==
Rouce attended Xavier University of Louisiana, a historically black college and university (HBCU) that has matriculated a record number of Black aspiring physicians to medical school. Rouce earned her medical degree and completed her residency in Pediatrics at the University of Texas Medical Branch in Galveston. She completed her fellowship in pediatric hematology/oncology at Texas Children's Cancer Center.

== Career ==
Rouce is associate professor of Pediatrics at Baylor College of Medicine, where she leads the task force for promoting equity in cancer trials. She leads DEI programs for several scientific organizations. Rouce serves on the Board of Directors of the Leukemia & Lymphoma Society and National Marrow Donor Program. She directs research on CAR T cell therapy and stem cell transplantation.

== Community engagement ==
Rouce leads a weekend science program at Baylor. She spent years volunteering for the Periwinkle Foundation helping children, siblings, and families affected with cancer. She served on a medical mission to Bolivia. Her fluency in Spanish has helped her serve patients and their families in Texas. She advocates for dismantling barriers to access to transplantation and other cell therapies.

After experiencing Hurricane Katrina while in college and losing her possessions during Hurricane Ike as a medical student in Galveston, Texas, Rouce organized relief efforts during both Hurricane Harvey and Hurricane Maria.

== Educational songs ==
Rouce raps her own educational songs as "Rizzo". She has performed her original science rap songs at national meetings, including the American Society of Hematology's ASH-a-Palooza each year since 2018. Her 2020 video performance, which can be viewed online, is accompanied by the ASH Blood Drop mascot and includes the lyrics:

What's a sickle cell, what does that entail?

A gene, modified, stem cell? A congressional briefing with a strategic plan? Can we do it in this lifetime? Yes we can!

The sky's the limit, benign or malignant!

In the song, she correctly predicted the development of gene therapy for sickle cell disease, namely Casgevy, which was FDA approved in 2023. Her 2024 performance at the HOSA international leadership conference is also viewable online.

== Selected publications ==
- Rouce RH, Louis CU, Heslop HE (November 2014). "Epstein-Barr virus lymphoproliferative disease after hematopoietic stem cell transplant". Curr Opin Hematol. 21 (6): 476–81. doi:10.1097/MOH.0000000000000083. PMC 4257464. PMID 25159713.
- Rouce RH (September 2015). "More than Memory: Potential of Adaptive Natural Killer Cells". Biol Blood Marrow Transplant. 21 (9): 1534–6. doi:10.1016/j.bbmt.2015.07.014. PMID 26211986.
- Rouce RH, Shaim H, Sekine T, Weber G, Ballard B, Ku S, Barese C, Murali V, Wu MF, Liu H, Shpall EJ, Bollard CM, Rabin KR, Rezvani K (April 2016). "The TGF-β/SMAD pathway is an important mechanism for NK cell immune evasion in childhood B-acute lymphoblastic leukemia". Leukemia. 30 (4): 800–11. doi:10.1038/leu.2015.327. PMC 4823160. PMID 26621337.
- Rezvani K, Rouce RH (2015). "The Application of Natural Killer Cell Immunotherapy for the Treatment of Cancer". Front Immunol. 6: 578. doi:10.3389/fimmu.2015.00578. PMC 4648067. PMID 26635792.
- Rouce RH, Heslop HE (June 2016). "Forecasting Cytokine Storms with New Predictive Biomarkers". Cancer Discov. 6 (6): 579–80. doi:10.1158/2159-8290.CD-16-0493. PMC 4894532. PMID 27261481.
- Rouce RH, Sharma S, Huynh M, Heslop HE (March 2017). "Recent advances in T-cell immunotherapy for haematological malignancies". Br J Haematol. 176 (5): 688–704. doi:10.1111/bjh.14470. PMC 5318250. PMID 27897332.
- Rouce RH, Heslop HE (June 2017). "Equal opportunity CAR T cells". Blood. 129 (25): 3275–3277. doi:10.1182/blood-2017-04-779983. PMC 5482104. PMID 28642356.
- Doherty E, Rouce RH (August 2018). "Primed to Kill: CTV-1 Stimulated Haploidentical Natural Killer Cells for Consolidation of AML". Biol Blood Marrow Transplant. 24 (8): 1533–1535. doi:10.1016/j.bbmt.2018.06.019. PMID 29933070.
- Sharma S, Rouce RH (April 2019). "Are we there yet? The never-ending quest for an Epstein-Barr virus vaccine". J Clin Invest. 129 (5): 1836–1838. doi:10.1172/JCI128370. PMC 6486379. PMID 30985295.
- Steffin DH, Hsieh EM, Rouce RH (August 2019). "Gene Therapy: Current Applications and Future Possibilities". Adv Pediatr. 66: 37–54. doi:10.1016/j.yapd.2019.04.001. PMID 31230699.
- Rouce RH (December 2019). "The earlier the better: timely mitigation of CRS". Blood. 134 (24): 2119–2120. doi:10.1182/blood.2019003618. PMID 31830277.
- Hsieh EM, Rouce RH (December 2020). "Chimeric antigen receptor T cells for mature B-cell lymphoma and Burkitt lymphoma". Hematology Am Soc Hematol Educ Program. 2020 (1): 487–493. doi:10.1182/hematology.2020000133. PMC 7727550. PMID 33275669.
- Rouce RH, Scherer L (August 2022). "Reverse translational studies inform dual-targeted CAR T-cell design". Blood. 140 (5): 409–410. doi:10.1182/blood.2022016928. PMID 35925644.
- Rouce RH, Nemecek E (February 2023). "Access offsets poverty in quest for CAR T cells". Blood. 141 (6): 558–560. doi:10.1182/blood.2022018552. PMID 36757731.
- Scherer LD, Rouce RH (September 2023). "Targeted cellular therapy for treatment of relapsed or refractory leukemia". Best Pract Res Clin Haematol. 36 (3) 101481. doi:10.1016/j.beha.2023.101481. PMID 37612000.
- Badr H, Rouce R, Scheurer ME, Lulla P, Mims M, Reddy P (December 2023). "Bringing CART therapy trials to underserved populations". Cancer Cell. 41 (12): 2007–2010. doi:10.1016/j.ccell.2023.10.002. PMC 11146682. PMID 37890490.
- Ma R, Woods M, Burkhardt P, Crooks N, van Leeuwen DG, Shmidt D, Couturier J, Chaumette A, Popat D, Hill LC, Rouce RH, Thakkar S, Orozco AF, Carisey AF, Brenner MK, Mamonkin M (July 2024). "Chimeric antigen receptor-induced antigen loss protects CD5.CART cells from fratricide without compromising on-target cytotoxicity". Cell Rep Med. 5 (7) 101628. doi:10.1016/j.xcrm.2024.101628. PMC 11293353. PMID 38986621.
- Mackall CL, Bollard CM, Goodman N, Carr C, Gardner R, Rouce R, Sotillo E, Stoner R, Urnov FD, Wayne AS, Park J, Kohn DB (July 2024). "Enhancing pediatric access to cell and gene therapies". Nat Med. 30 (7): 1836–1846. doi:10.1038/s41591-024-03035-1. PMID 38886624.
- Rouce RH, Porteus MH (August 2024). "Cell and gene therapy accessibility". Science. 385 (6708): 475. Bibcode:2024Sci...385..475R. doi:10.1126/science.ads0252. PMID 39088615.
