= CRYBG1 =

Protein-coding gene in humans

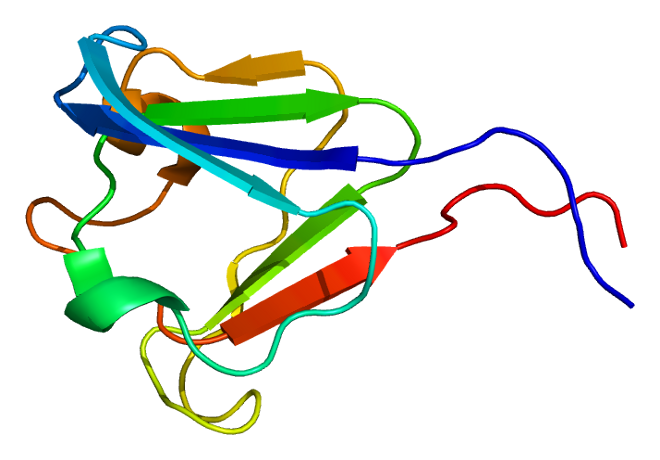

Identifiers
- Aliases: CRYBG1, ST4, AIM1, absent in melanoma 1, crystallin beta-gamma domain containing 1
- External IDs: OMIM: 601797; MGI: 109544; GeneCards: CRYBG1
Available structures
PDB	Human UniProt search: PDBe RCSB
PDB	List of PDB id codes 3CW3, 2DAD,%%s2DAD

Gene location (Human)
Chr.	Chromosome 6 (human)
Band	6q21	Start	106,360,717 bp
Band	6q21	End	106,572,017 bp

Gene location (Mouse)
Chr.	Chromosome 10 (mouse)
Band	10 B2|10 23.14 cM	Start	43,826,632 bp
Band	10 B2|10 23.14 cM	End	44,024,849 bp
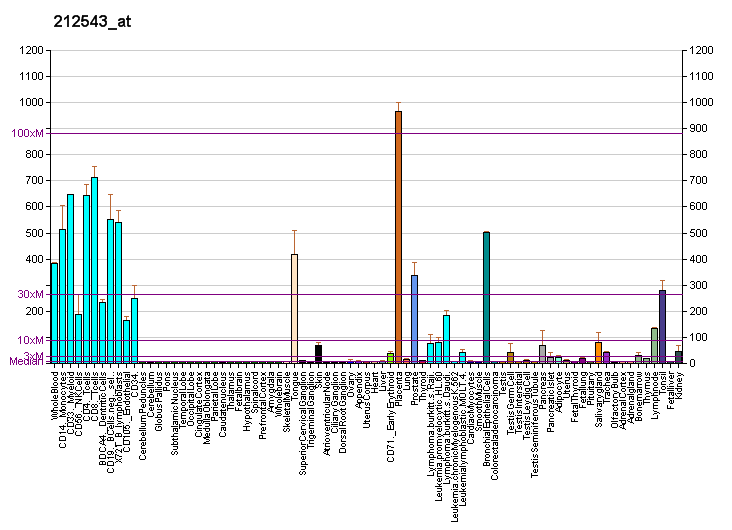
RNA expression pattern
Bgee	Human / Mouse (ortholog); Top expressed in: skin of thigh; oral cavity; gums; pancreatic ductal cell; gingival epithelium; mucosa of pharynx; placenta; vulva; palpebral conjunctiva; skin of hip / Top expressed in: corneal stroma; Ileal epithelium; superior surface of tongue; esophagus; lip; skin of back; transitional epithelium of urinary bladder; skin of external ear; lactiferous gland; zygote; More reference expression data
BioGPS	More reference expression data
Gene ontology
Molecular function	carbohydrate binding; molecular function
Cellular component	cellular component
Biological process	biological process
Sources:Amigo / QuickGO
Orthologs
Databases	NCBI: entry; OMA: entry
Species	Human	Mouse
Entrez	202	11630
Ensembl	ENSG00000112297	ENSMUSG00000019866
UniProt	Q9Y4K1; Q96QW7	n/a
RefSeq (mRNA)	NM_001624; NM_001371242	NM_172393; NM_001368305; NM_001368306
RefSeq (protein)	NP_001615; NP_001358171	n/a
Location (UCSC)	Chr 6: 106.36 – 106.57 Mb	Chr 10: 43.83 – 44.02 Mb
PubMed search
- Wikidata
View/Edit Human	View/Edit Mouse

Crystallin beta-gamma domain containing 1 is a protein that in humans is encoded by the CRYBG1 gene (previously AIM1).
