= STK10 =

Protein-coding gene in the species Homo sapiens

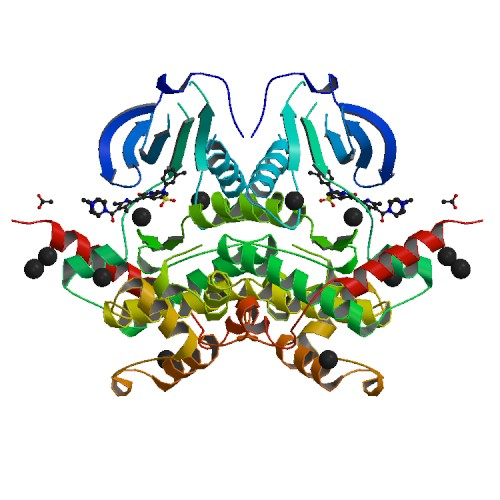

Identifiers
- Aliases: STK10, LOK, PRO2729, serine/threonine kinase 10
- External IDs: OMIM: 603919; MGI: 1099439; GeneCards: STK10
Available structures
PDB	Ortholog search: PDBe RCSB
PDB	List of PDB id codes 2J7T, 4AOT, 4BC6, 4EQU, 4USD, 4USE, 5AJQ
Enzyme activity
EC #	BRENDA	ExPASy	KEGG	MetaCyc
2.7.11.1	↗	↗	↗	↗

Gene location (Human)
Chr.	Chromosome 5 (human)
Band	5q35.1	Start	172,042,079 bp
Band	5q35.1	End	172,188,224 bp

Gene location (Mouse)
Chr.	Chromosome 11 (mouse)
Band	11 18.97 cM|11 A4	Start	32,483,305 bp
Band	11 18.97 cM|11 A4	End	32,574,587 bp
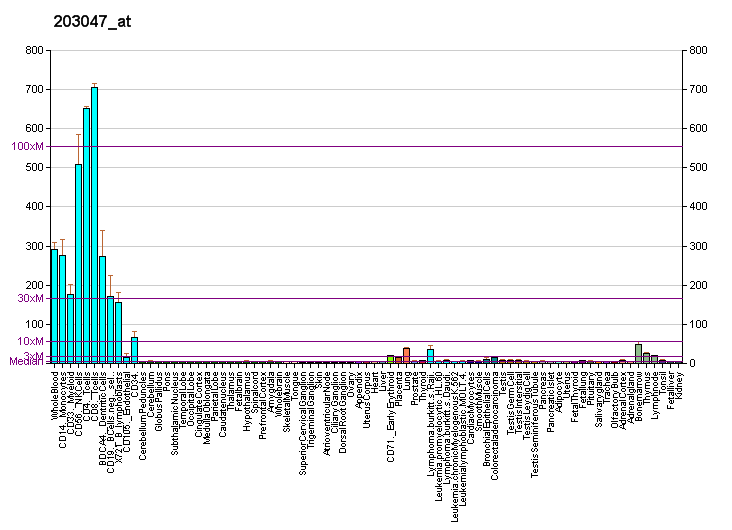

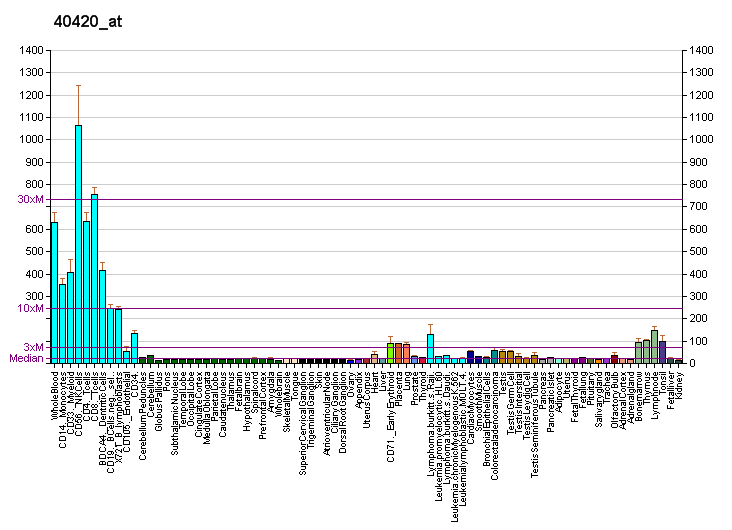
RNA expression pattern
Bgee	Human / Mouse (ortholog); Top expressed in: granulocyte; sural nerve; blood; monocyte; spleen; cerebellar hemisphere; right hemisphere of cerebellum; bone marrow cell; upper lobe of left lung; lymph node / Top expressed in: granulocyte; mesenteric lymph nodes; blood; spleen; sciatic nerve; seminiferous tubule; decidua; bone marrow; intestinal villus; external carotid artery; More reference expression data
BioGPS	More reference expression data
Gene ontology
Molecular function	transferase activity; nucleotide binding; protein kinase activity; protein homodimerization activity; kinase activity; protein binding; identical protein binding; ATP binding; protein serine/threonine kinase activity
Cellular component	cytoplasm; membrane; extracellular exosome; plasma membrane; specific granule membrane
Biological process	lymphocyte aggregation; phosphorylation; regulation of lymphocyte migration; protein autophosphorylation; cell cycle; protein phosphorylation; neutrophil degranulation; regulation of mitotic cell cycle; signal transduction; stress-activated protein kinase signaling cascade; activation of protein kinase activity; regulation of apoptotic process
Sources:Amigo / QuickGO
Orthologs
Databases	NCBI: entry; OMA: entry
Species	Human	Mouse
Entrez	6793	20868
Ensembl	ENSG00000072786	ENSMUSG00000020272
UniProt	O94804	O55098
RefSeq (mRNA)	NM_005990	NM_009288; NM_001359177; NM_001359178
RefSeq (protein)	NP_005981	NP_033314; NP_001346106; NP_001346107
Location (UCSC)	Chr 5: 172.04 – 172.19 Mb	Chr 11: 32.48 – 32.57 Mb
PubMed search
- Wikidata
View/Edit Human	View/Edit Mouse

Serine/threonine-protein kinase 10 is an enzyme that in humans is encoded by the STK10 gene.

This gene encodes a member of the Ste20 family of serine/threonine protein kinases, and is similar to several known polo-like kinase kinases. The protein can associate with and phosphorylate polo-like kinase 1, and overexpression of a kinase-dead version of the protein interferes with normal cell cycle progression. The kinase can also negatively regulate interleukin 2 expression in T-cells via the mitogen activated protein kinase kinase 1 pathway.
