= Subcutaneous T-cell lymphoma =

- Specialty: Oncology, cutaneous oncology
- Complications: HPS (hemophagocytic syndrome)
- Diagnostic method: Requires biopsy confirmation by expert hemopathologist
- Differential diagnosis: Lupus panniculitis, cutaneous gamma delta T Cell lymphoma

Subcutaneous T-cell lymphoma (also known as a "panniculitis-like T-cell lymphoma") is a cutaneous condition that most commonly presents in young adults, and is characterized by subcutaneous nodules. Common symptoms include fever, fatigue, and pancytopenia.

== Diagnosis ==
=== Classification ===
Subcutaneous panniculitis-like T-cell lymphoma is a subtype of peripheral T-cell lymphoma. Peripheral T-cell lymphoma (PTCL) is defined as a diverse group of aggressive lymphomas that develop from mature-stage white blood cells called T-cells and natural killer cells (NK cells) (see figure for an overview of PTCL subtypes). PTCL is a type of non-Hodgkin's lymphoma (NHL). NHL affects two particular types of white blood cells: B-cells and T-cells. PTCL specifically affects T-cells, and results when T-cells develop and grow abnormally.

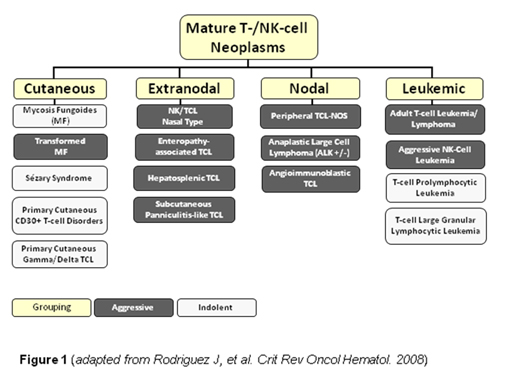

Subcutaneous panniculitis-like T-cell lymphoma is a rare type of lymphoma that infiltrates the subcutaneous fat but does not involve the skin. There are two subtypes – alpha-beta and gamma-delta. Patients with the gamma-delta subtype have a more aggressive clinical course.

It is described as CD3+/CD4-/CD8+, with CD30 and CD56 usually negative.

== Treatment ==
Historically, subcutaneous panniculitis-like T-cell lymphoma, as with other types of T-cell lymphoma, was treated similarly to B-cell lymphomas. However, in recent years, scientists have developed techniques to better recognize the different types of lymphomas, such as PTCL. It is now understood that PTCL behaves differently from B-cell lymphomas and therapies are being developed that specifically target these types of lymphoma. Currently, however, there are no drugs approved by the U.S. Food and Drug Administration (FDA) specifically for PTCL. There are two drugs, Pralatrexate and Romidepsin, which are both approved by the FDA for relapsed or refractory T cell lymphoma. Anthracycline-containing chemotherapy regimens are commonly offered as the initial therapy. Some patients may receive an autologous or allogeneic stem cell transplant. Novel approaches to the treatment of PTCL in the relapsed or refractory setting are under investigation.

CHOP or CHOP-like regimens have been used.

== Research ==
Pralatrexate is one compound currently under investigation to add to the frontline treatment of PTCL. It is currently approved by the FDA for relapsed or refractory T cell lymphoma. Side effects include mouth sores, which can be severe.

== See also ==
- Cutaneous T-cell lymphoma
- Lennert lymphoma
- Skin lesion
