= TIA1 =

Mammalian protein found in Homo sapiens

Identifiers
- Aliases: TIA1, TIA-1, WDM, TIA1 cytotoxic granule-associated RNA binding protein, TIA1 cytotoxic granule associated RNA binding protein
- External IDs: OMIM: 603518; MGI: 107914; GeneCards: TIA1
Available structures
PDB	Ortholog search: PDBe RCSB
PDB	List of PDB id codes 2MJN, 3BS9

Gene location (Mouse)
Chr.	Chromosome 6 (mouse)
Band	6|6 D1	Start	86,381,201 bp
Band	6|6 D1	End	86,410,387 bp
Gene ontology
Molecular function	nucleic acid binding; protein binding; poly(A) binding; RNA binding; mRNA 3'-UTR AU-rich region binding
Cellular component	cytoplasm; cytoplasmic stress granule; nuclear stress granule; nucleus; nucleoplasm; cytosol; ribonucleoprotein complex
Biological process	negative regulation of translation; positive regulation of epithelial cell apoptotic process; regulation of mRNA splicing, via spliceosome; protein localization to cytoplasmic stress granule; apoptotic process; fibroblast growth factor receptor signaling pathway
Sources:Amigo / QuickGO
Orthologs
Databases	NCBI: entry; OMA: entry
Species	Human	Mouse
Entrez	7072	21841
Ensembl	ENSG00000116001	ENSMUSG00000071337
UniProt	P31483	P52912
RefSeq (mRNA)	NM_022037; NM_022173	NM_001164078; NM_001164079; NM_011585
RefSeq (protein)	NP_071320; NP_071505; NP_001338437; NP_001338438; NP_001338439 NP_001338440; NP_001338441; NP_001338443; NP_001338444; NP_001338445; NP_001338446; NP_001338447; NP_001338448; NP_001338449; NP_001338450; NP_001338451; NP_001338452; NP_001338453; NP_001338454; NP_001338442	NP_001157550; NP_001157551; NP_035715
Location (UCSC)	n/a	Chr 6: 86.38 – 86.41 Mb
PubMed search
- Wikidata
View/Edit Human	View/Edit Mouse

TIA1 or Tia1 cytotoxic granule-associated rna binding protein is a 3'UTR mRNA binding protein that can bind the 5'TOP sequence of 5'TOP mRNAs. It is associated with programmed cell death (apoptosis) and regulates alternative splicing of the gene encoding the Fas receptor, an apoptosis-promoting protein. Under stress conditions, TIA1 localizes to cellular RNA-protein conglomerations called stress granules. It is encoded by the TIA1 gene.

Mutations in the TIA1 gene have been associated with amyotrophic lateral sclerosis, frontotemporal dementia, and Welander distal myopathy. It also plays a crucial role in the development of toxic oligomeric tau in Alzheimer's disease.

== Function ==
This protein is a member of a RNA-binding protein family that regulates transcription and RNA translation. It was first identified in cytotoxic lymphocyte (CTL) target cells. TIA1 acts in the nucleus to regulate splicing and transcription. TIA1 helps to recruit the splicesome to regulate RNA splicing, and it inhibits transcription of multiple genes, such as the cytokine Tumor necrosis factor alpha. In response to stress, TIA1 translocates from the nucleus to the cytoplasm, where it nucleates a type of RNA granule, termed the stress granule, and participates in the translational stress response. As part of the translational stress response, TIA1 works in cooperation with other RNA binding proteins to sequester RNA transcripts away from the ribosome, which allows the cell to focus its protein synthesis/RNA translation machinery on producing proteins that will address the particular stress. It has been suggested that this protein may be involved in the induction of apoptosis as it preferentially recognizes poly(A) homopolymers and induces DNA fragmentation in CTL targets. The major granule-associated species is a 15-kDa protein that is thought to be derived from the carboxyl terminus of the 40-kDa product by proteolytic processing. Alternative splicing resulting in different isoforms of this gene product have been described.

== See also ==
- Stress granule
- T-cell large granular lymphocyte leukemia
