= Peripheral T-cell lymphoma not otherwise specified =

Peripheral T-cell lymphoma-Not-Otherwise-Specified
- Specialty: Oncology

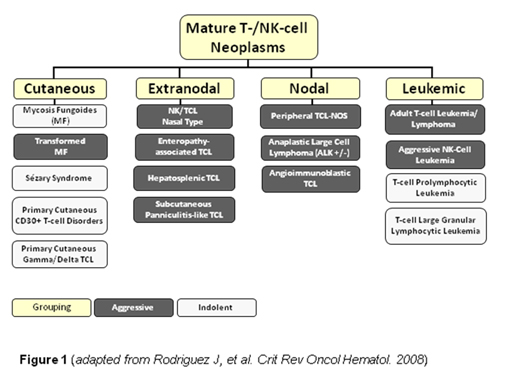
Subtypes of T-cell lymphoma

Peripheral T-cell lymphoma not otherwise specified (PTCL-NOS), is a subtype of peripheral T-cell lymphoma. Peripheral T-cell lymphoma (PTCL) is defined as a diverse group of aggressive lymphomas that develop from mature-stage white blood cells called T-cells and natural killer cells (NK cells) (see figure for an overview of PTCL subtypes). PTCL is a type of non-Hodgkin's lymphoma (NHL). PTCL specifically affects T-cells rather than B-cells, and results when T-cells develop and grow abnormally.

About 30% of PTCL-NOS cases exhibit malignant T cells that are infected with the Epstein-Barr virus (EBV). When associated with EBV, PTCL-NOS is classified as one of the Epstein-Barr virus-associated lymphoproliferative diseases (see Epstein-Barr virus-associated peripheral T cell lymphoma, not otherwise specified) but the relationship of EBV to the development and progression of Epstein-Barr virus-associated PTCL-NOS is unclear.

PTCL-NOS, the most common subtype of PTCL, is aggressive and predominantly nodal. There are two morphologic variants: the T-zone lymphoma variant and the lymphoepithelioid cell variant.

- T-zone lymphoma is so named for its involvement in a specific area of the lymph node that consists of a dense accumulation of T-cells.
- Lympho-epithelioid lymphoma, also called Lennert's lymphoma, is rare and generally affects older individuals.

== Treatment ==
Currently PTCL is treated similarly to B-cell lymphomas. However, in recent years, scientists have developed techniques to better recognize the different types of lymphomas, such as PTCL. It is now understood that PTCL behaves differently from B-cell lymphomas and therapies are being developed that specifically target these types of lymphoma. Currently, however, there are no therapies approved by the US Food and Drug Administration (FDA) specifically for PTCL. Anthracycline-containing chemotherapy regimens are commonly offered as the initial therapy. Some patients may receive a stem cell transplant. Novel approaches to the treatment of PTCL in the relapsed or refractory setting are under investigation.

Pralatrexate and cerdulatinib are some of the compounds currently under investigations for the treatment of PTC.
