= Radiologically isolated syndrome (multiple sclerosis) =

Clinical situation indicative of possible multiple sclerosis

Radiologically isolated syndrome (RIS) is a clinical situation in which a person has white matter lesions suggestive of multiple sclerosis (MS), as shown on an MRI scan that was done for reasons unrelated to MS symptoms. The nerve lesions in these people show dissemination in space with an otherwise normal neurological examination and without historical accounts of typical MS symptoms.

MRI findings that are consistent with multiple sclerosis have been observed in healthy people who underwent MRI scanning, and 50% go on to develop symptomatic MS, sometimes with a primary progressive course. This condition was first characterized in 2009.

== Diagnosis ==
The criteria for an RIS diagnosis are as follows:

1. The presence of incidental MRI findings in the CNS white matter:
  1. Ovoid and well-circumscribed homogeneous foci, with or without involvement of the corpus callosum
  2. T2 hyperintensities larger than 3 mm in diameter, which fulfill at least 3 of the 4 Barkhof MRI criteria for DIS
  3. The CNS abnormalities are not consistent with a vascular condition
2. No historical accounts of clinical symptoms consistent with neurological dysfunction.
3. MRI anomalies do not account for apparent impairment in social, occupational, or generalized areas of functioning.
4. MRI anomalies are not due to substance abuse, such as recreational drug use, toxic exposure, or a prior known medical condition.
5. Exclusion of a differential diagnosis of leukoaraiosis, or extensive white matter pathology excluding the corpus callosum.
6. MRI anomalies of the CNS are not accounted for by another disease.

=== Discovery ===
RIS is discovered when an MRI scan is performed for other reasons. The most common symptom that led to the incidental discovery of RIS is headache. Other common reasons are trauma, psychiatric disorders, and endocrinological disorders.

== Management ==
Currently, routine clinical follow-up and MRI neuroimaging surveillance is the standard by which patients are observed. While treatment of MS disease modifying therapies have been given to some individuals with RIS, the majority opt for active surveillance and the appearance of clinical symptoms before commencing treatment, as treatment is considered controversial.

== Prognosis ==
In a 5 year study, clinical events, which refers to the first symptoms of exacerbations, clinical attacks, flare ups, or severe symptoms, indicative of MS, appeared in 34% of individuals. Of those who developed symptoms, 9.6% fulfilled criteria for primary progressive multiple sclerosis (PPMS).

== Epidemiology ==
Due to the incidental nature of RIS, exact figures on prevalence is unknown, though it has been suggested that RIS is the most common type of asymptomatic MS. The prevalence may be higher in relatives of patients with MS. One study, at a university hospital that is located in a high region of MS disease incidence, put the disease prevalence at approximately 1 in 2000. An earlier study in 1961 of 15,644 autopsies found 12 cases (0.08%) of unexpected MS findings without a previous history of MS symptoms. The mean age of first indication of RIS from 451 patients is 37.2 years.

== RIS in children ==
Though rare, some children that have had MRI scans for reasons unrelated to MS have shown signs of RIS. The most common reason for an initial MRI in these children was a headache. The first occurrence of a clinical event characteristic of MS in nearly half of the children examined was 2 years, though in a majority of cases, 'radiologic evolution', i.e. the increase in the number of size of lesions as detected in subsequent MRI, developed after one year. The presence of oligoclonal bands in the CSF and spinal cord lesions were associated with an increased risk of a first clinical event characteristic of MS. It was found that children with RIS had a substantial risk of subsequent clinical symptoms and/or radiologic evolution.

== Research directions ==
Calls have been made for longer prospective studies, tracking the development of potential disease progression over a longer period of time are warranted. This would ensure criteria in RIS is satisfactory and whether consideration should be given to treating individuals with RIS on current MS medication.

RIS has been linked to prodromal multiple sclerosis.

== Etymology ==
The acronym RIS was coined in 2009 by Okuda and colleagues. Siva and colleagues suggested an alternate name, radiologically uncovered asymptomatic possible inflammatory-demyelinating disease (RAPIDD).
