= Biomarkers of multiple sclerosis =

Several biomarkers for diagnosis of multiple sclerosis, disease evolution, and response to medication (current or expected) are currently undergoing research. While most of them are still under research, some are already well-established:

- Oligoclonal bands (OCB): They present proteins that are in the central nervous system (CNS) or in blood. Those that are in CNS but not in blood suggest a diagnosis of MS.
- MRZ-Reaction: A polyspecific antiviral immune response against the viruses of measles, rubella, and zoster was found in 1992. In some reports, the MRZ-R showed a lower sensitivity than OCB (70% vs. 100%), but a higher specificity (69% vs. 92%) for MS.
- Free light chains (FLC): Several authors have reported that they are comparable to or better than oligoclonal bands.

There are several types of biomarkers, including body fluid biomarkers, imaging biomarkers, and genetic biomarkers. They are expected to play an important role in the near future of MS.

== Classification ==
A biomarker is a characteristic that is objectively measured and evaluated as an indicator of normal biological processes, pathogenic processes, or pharmacological responses to a therapeutic intervention. Type 0 biomarkers are those related to the course of a pathogenic process, and type 1 biomarkers are those that show the effects of the therapeutical intervention.

Biomarkers can be classified according to several criteria. It is common to classify them according to their source (imaging biomarkers, body fluid biomarkers, and genetic biomarkers) or their utility (diagnosis, evolution, and response to medication)

Among the imaging biomarkers in MS, the most well-known is MRI by two methods: gadolinium contrast and T2-hypertense lesions. Also important are PET and OCT.

Among the body fluid biomarkers, the most known are oligoclonal bands in cerebrospinal fluid (CSF). Several others are under research.

Genetic biomarkers are under research, with no conclusive results.

Classification by utility involves diagnosis biomarkers, evolution biomarkers, and response to medication biomarkers.

== Biomarkers for diagnosis ==
Apart from its possible involvement in disease pathogenesis, vitamin D has been proposed as a biomarker of the disease evolution.

Diagnosis of MS has always been made by clinical examination, supported by MRI or CSF tests. In accordance with both the pure autoimmune hypothesis and the immune-mediated hypothesis, researchers expect to find biomarkers to yield a better diagnosis and predict the response to different available treatments.

As of 2016, no specific biomarker for MS has been found, but studies are ongoing. Some researchers are focusing on specific diagnosis for each of the clinical courses.

Among the studies for blood tests, the highest sensitivity and specificity reported to-date is the testing of circulating erythrocytes (s=98.3%, e=89.5%). A good result was also obtained using methylation patterns of circulating cell debris specific for a number of conditions, including relapsing-remitting MS (RRMS). There are ongoing efforts to diagnose MS by analyzing myelin debris in the bloodstream.

As of 2014, the only fully specific biomarkers found were four proteins in the CSF: CRTAC-IB (cartilage acidic protein), tetranectin (a plasminogen-binding protein), SPARC-like protein (a calcium binding cell signalling glycoprotein), and autotaxin-T (a phosphodiesterase). This list was expanded in 2016, with three CSF proteins (immunoglobulins) reported as specific for MS: Ig γ-1 (chain C region), Ig heavy chain V-III (region BRO), and Ig-κ-chain (C region).

== For existing damage and disease evolution ==
During a clinical trial for one of the main MS drugs, a catheter was inserted into the ventricles of patients' brains. Existing damage was evaluated and correlated with body fluids. In primary progressive MS (PPMS), neurofilament light chain (NF-L) level in CSF and serum is a sensitive and specific marker for white matter axonal injury.

Regarding biomarkers for MRI imaging, radial diffusivity has been suggested as a biomarker associated with the level of myelination in MS lesions. However, it is also affected by tissue destruction, which may lead to exaggeration of diffusivity measures. Distinct patterns of diffusivity in MS lesions suggest that axonal loss dominates in the T1 hypointense core, and the effects of de/remyelination may be better detected in the "T2-rim", where there is relative preservation of structural integrity.

Glial fibrillary acidic protein (GFAP) has been indicated as a possible biomarker for the progression of MS. The blood level of GFAP increases when astrocytes are damaged or activated, and elevated levels of the protein's cellular component correlate with severity of MS symptoms.

== Treatments and response to therapy ==
Currently, the only clear biomarker that predicts a response to therapy is the presence of anti-MOG autoantibodies in blood. Anti-MOG seropositive patients do not respond to approved MS medications. It seems that MS with anti-MOG positivity could be considered a different disease in the near future.

Comparative Effectiveness Research (CER) is an emerging field in the treatment of Multiple Sclerosis. The response of the disease to currently available medications cannot be predicted.

The ideal target is to find subtypes of the disease that respond better to specific treatments. An example could be the discovery that the presence of a gene called SLC9A9 appears in people who fail to respond to interferon β therapy, or that the disregulation of some transcription factors define molecular subtypes of the disease. Another example could be the Hellberg-Eklund score for predicting the response to Natalizumab.

Though biomarkers are normally assumed to be chemical compounds in body fluids, images can also be considered a biomarker. Fingolimod has been found to be especially suitable for patients with frequently relapsing spinal cord lesions with open-ring enhancement. Patients with spinal cord lesions may have different T-helper cell patterns than those with brain lesions.

Biomarkers are also important for expected responses to therapy. In 2000, it was discovered that patients with pattern II lesions were dramatically responsive to plasmapheresis. In February 2016, the first patent to test the lesion pattern of a patient without biopsy was granted.

Other examples could be the proposal for protein SLC9A9 (gen Solute carrier family 9) as a biomarker for the response to interferon beta, as it happens for serum cytokine profiles. The same was proposed to MxA protein mRNA. The presence of anti-MOG, even with charge detection mass spectrometry (CDMS) diagnosis, can be considered as a biomarker against MS disease-modifying therapies like fingolimod.

=== Molecular biomarkers in blood ===
Blood serum of MS patients shows abnormalities. Endothelin-1 shows maybe the most striking discordance between patients and controls, being a 224% higher in patients than controls.

Creatine and Uric acid levels are lower than normal, at least in women. Ex vivo CD4(+) T cells isolated from the circulation show a wrong TIM-3 (Immunoregulation) behavior, and relapses are associated with CD8(+) T Cells. There is a set of differentially expressed genes between MS and healthy subjects in peripheral blood T cells from clinically active MS patients. There are also differences between acute relapses and complete remissions. Platelets are known to have abnormal high levels.

MS patients are also known to be CD46 defective, and this leads to Interleukin-10 (IL-10) deficiency, being this involved in the inflammatory reactions. Levels of IL-2, IL-10, and GM-CSF are lower in MS females than normal. IL6 is higher instead. These findings do not apply to men. This IL-10 could be related to the mechanism of action of methylprednisolone, together with CCL2. Interleukin IL-12 is also known to be associated with relapses, but this is unlikely to be related to the response to steroids.

Kallikreins are found in serum and are associated with secondary progressive stage. Related to this, it has been found that B1-receptors, part of the kallikrein-kinin-system, are involved in the BBB breakdown.

There is evidence of Apoptosis-related molecules in blood and they are related to disease activity. B cells in CSF appear, and they correlate with early brain inflammation. There is also an overexpression of IgG-free kappa light chain protein in both CIS and RR-MS patients, compared with control subjects, together with an increased expression of an isoforms of apolipoprotein E in RR-MS. Expression of some specific proteins in circulating CD4+ T cells is a risk factor for conversion from CIS to clinically defined multiple sclerosis.

Recently, unique autoantibody patterns that distinguish RRMS, secondary progressive (SPMS), and primary progressive (PPMS) have been found, based on up- and down-regulation of CNS antigens, tested by microarrays. In particular, RRMS is characterized by autoantibodies to heat shock proteins that were not observed in PPMS or SPMS. These antibodies patterns can be used to monitor disease progression.

Finally, a promising biomarker under study is an antibody against the potassium channel protein KIR4.1. This biomarker has been reported to be present in around a half of MS patients, but in nearly none of the controls.

=== Micro-RNA in blood ===
Micro-RNA are non-coding RNA of around 22 nucleotides in length. They are present in blood and in CSF. Several studies have found specific micro-RNA signatures for MS. They have been proposed as biomarkers for the presence of the disease and its evolution and some of them like miR-150 are under study, specially for those with lipid-specific oligoclonal IgM bands

Circulating MicroRNAs have been proposed as biomarkers. There is current evidence that at least 60 circulating miRNAs would be dysregulated in MS patient's blood and profiling results are continuously emerging. Circulating miRNAs are highly stable in blood, easy to collect, and the quantification method, if standardized, can be accurate and cheap. They are putative biomarkers to diagnose MS but could also serve differentiating MS subtypes, anticipating relapses and proposing a customized treatment. MiRNA has even been proposed as a primary cause of MS and its white matter damaged areas

=== Genetic biomarkers for MS type ===
By RNA profile
Also in blood serum can be found the RNA type of the MS patient. Two types have been proposed classifying the patients as MSA or MSB, allegedly predicting future inflammatory events.

By transcription factor
The autoimmune disease-associated transcription factors EOMES and TBX21 are dysregulated in multiple sclerosis and define a molecular subtype of disease. The importance of this discovery is that the expression of these genes appears in blood and can be measured by a simple blood analysis.

NR1H3 Mutation.
Some PPMS patients have been found to have a special genetic variant named rapidly progressive multiple sclerosis In these cases MS is due to a mutation inside the gene NR1H3, an arginine to glutamine mutation in the position p.Arg415Gln, in an area that codifies the protein LXRA.

=== In blood vessel tissue ===
Endothelial dysfunction has been reported in MS and could be used as biomarker via biopsia. Blood circulation is slower in MS patients and can be measured using contrast or by MRI

Interleukin-12p40 has been reported to separate RRMS and CIS from other neurological diseases

=== In cerebrospinal fluid ===
The most specific laboratory marker of MS reported to date, as of 2016, is the intrathecal MRZ (Measles, Rubella and Varicella) reaction showing 78% sensitivity and 97% specificity.

It has been known for quite some time that glutamate is present at higher levels in CSF during relapses, maybe because of the IL-17 disregulation, and to MS patients before relapses compared to healthy subjects. This observation has been linked to the activity of the infiltrating leukocytes and activated microglia, and to the damage to the axons and to the oligodendrocytes damage, supposed to be the main cleaning agents for glutamate

Also a specific MS protein has been found in CSF, chromogranin A, possibly related to axonal degeneration. It appears together with clusterin and complement C3, markers of complement-mediated inflammatory reactions. Also Fibroblast growth factor-2 appear higher at CSF.

Varicella-zoster virus particles have been found in CSF of patients during relapses, but this particles are virtually absent during remissions. Plasma Cells in the cerebrospinal fluid of MS patients could also be used for diagnosis, because they have been found to produce myelin-specific antibodies. As of 2011, a recently discovered myelin protein TPPP/p25, has been found in CSF of MS patients

A study found that quantification of several immune cell subsets, both in blood and CSF, showed differences between intrathecal (from the spine) and systemic immunity, and between CSF cell subtypes in the inflammatory and noninflammatory groups (basically RRMS/SPMS compared to PPMS). This showed that some patients diagnosed with PPMS shared an inflammatory profile with RRMS and SPMS, while others didn't.

Other study found using a proteomic analysis of the CSF that the peak intensity of the signals corresponding to Secretogranin II and Protein 7B2 were significantly upregulated in RRMS patients compared to PrMS (p<0.05), whereas the signals of Fibrinogen and Fibrinopeptide A were significantly downregulated in CIS compared to PrMS patients

As of 2014 it is considered that the CSF signature of MS is a combination of cytokines CSF lactate has been found to correlate to disease progression

Three proteins in CSF have been found to be specific for MS. They are the following immunoglobulins: Ig γ-1 (chain C region), Ig heavy chain V-III (region BRO) and Ig-κ-chain (C region)

Other interesting byproduct of the MS attack are the neurofilaments, remainings of the neural damage and the immunoglobulin heavy chains.

=== Oligoclonal bands ===
CSF also shows oligoclonal bands (OCB) in the majority (around 95%) of the patients. Several studies have reported differences between patients with and without OCB with regard to clinical parameters such as age, gender, disease duration, clinical severity and several MRI characteristics, together with a varying lesion load. CSF oligoclonal bands can be reflected in serum or not. This points to a heterogeneous origin of them

Though early theories assumed that the OCBs were somehow pathogenic autoantigens, recent research has shown that the immunoglobulins present in them are antibodies against debris, and therefore, OCBs seem to be just a secondary effect of MS.

Given that OCBs are not pathogenic, their remaining importance is to demonstrate the production of intrathecal immunoglobins (IgGs) against debris, but this can be shown by other methods. Specially interesting are the free light chains (FLC), specially the kappa-FLCs (kFLCs). Free kappa chains in CSF have been proposed as a marker for MS evolution

=== Biomarkers in brain cells and biopsies ===
Abnormal sodium distribution has been reported in living MS brains. In the early-stage RRMS patients, sodium MRI revealed abnormally high concentrations of sodium in brainstem, cerebellum and temporal pole. In the advanced-stage RRMS patients, abnormally high sodium accumulation was widespread throughout the whole brain, including normal appearing brain tissue. It is currently unknown whether post-mortem brains are consistent with this observation.

The pre-active lesions are clusters of microglia driven by the HspB5 protein, thought to be produced by stressed oligodendrocytes. The presence of HspB5 in biopsies can be a marker for lesion development.

Retinal cells are considered part of the CNS and present a characteristic thickness loss that can separate MS from NMO

=== Biomarkers for the clinical course ===
Currently it is possible to distinguish between the three main clinical courses (RRMS, SPMS and PPMS) using a combination of four blood protein tests with an accuracy around 80%

Currently the best predictor for clinical multiple sclerosis is the number of T2 lesions visualized by MRI during the CIS, but it has been proposed to complement it with MRI measures of BBB permeability It is normal to evaluate diagnostic criteria against the "time to conversion to definite".

A 2025 study found that, in comparison to MRI-only models, incorporating serum neurofilament light chain (sNfL) levels provides an improved framework to stage disease progression and inform prognosis.

== Imaging biomarkers: MRI, PET and OCT ==
Magnetic resonance (MRI) and positron emission tomography (PET) are two techniques currently used in MS research. While the first one is routinely used in clinical practice, the second one is also helping to understand the nature of the disease.

In MRI, some post-processing techniques have improved the image. SWI-adjusted magnetic resonance has given results close to 100% specificity and sensitivity respect McDonald's CDMS status and magnetization transfer MRI has shown that NAWM evolves during the disease reducing its magnetization transfer coefficient.

PET is able to show the activation status of microglia, which are macrophage-like cells of the CNS and whose activation is thought to be related to the development of the lesions. Microglial activation is shown using tracers for the 18 kDa translocator protein (TSPO) like the radioligand ^{11}[C]PK11195

== Biomarkers for MS pathological subtype ==
Differences have been found between the proteins expressed by patients and healthy subjects, and between attacks and remissions. Using DNA microarray technology groups of molecular biomarkers can be established. For example, it is known that Anti-lipid oligoclonal IgM bands (OCMB) distinguish MS patients with early aggressive course and that these patients show a favourable response to immunomodulatory treatment.

It seems that Fas and MIF are candidate biomarkers of progressive neurodegeneration. Upregulated levels of sFas (soluble form of Fas molecule) were found in MS patients with hypotensive lesions with progressive neurodegeneration, and also levels of MIF appeared to be higher in progressive than in non-progressing patients. Serum TNF-α and CCL2 seem to reflect the presence of inflammatory responses in primary progressive MS.

As previously reported, there is an antibody against the potassium channel protein KIR4.1 which is present in around a half of MS patients, but in nearly none of the controls, pointing towards a heterogeneous etiology in MS. The same happens with B-Cells

=== DRB3*02:02 patients ===
Specially interesting is the case of DRB3*02:02 patients (HLA-DRB3*–positive patients), which seem to have a clear autoimmune reaction against a protein called GDP-L-fucose synthase.

== Biomarkers for response to therapy ==
Response to therapy is heterogeneous in MS. Serum cytokine profiles have been proposed as biomarkers for response to Betaseron and the same was proposed to MxA mRNA.
