= Clinically isolated syndrome =

Syndrome after a neurological episode

A clinically isolated syndrome (CIS) is a clinical situation of an individual's first neurological episode, caused by inflammation or demyelination of nerve tissue. An episode may be monofocal, in which symptoms present at a single site in the central nervous system, or multifocal, in which multiple sites exhibit symptoms. CIS with enough paraclinical evidence can be considered as a clinical stage of multiple sclerosis (MS). It can also be retrospectively diagnosed as a kind of MS when more evidence is available.

Brain lesions associated with a clinically isolated syndrome may be indicative of several neurological diseases, like multiple sclerosis (MS) or neuromyelitis optica. In order for such a diagnosis, multiple sites in the central nervous system must present lesions, typically over multiple episodes, and for which no other diagnosis is likely. A clinically definitive diagnosis of MS is made once an MRI detects lesions in the brain, consistent with those typical of MS. Other diagnostics include cerebrospinal fluid analysis and evoked response testing.

Currently it is considered that the best predictor of future development of clinical multiple sclerosis is the number of T2 lesions visualized by magnetic resonance imaging during the CIS and their size. It is normal to evaluate diagnostic criteria against the "time to conversion to definite".

In 2001, the International Panel on the Diagnosis of multiple sclerosis issued the McDonald criteria, a revision of the previous diagnostic procedures to detect MS, known as the Poser criteria. "While maintaining the basic requirements of dissemination in time and space, the McDonald criteria provided specific guidelines for using findings on MRI and cerebrospinal fluid analysis to provide evidence of the second attack in those individuals who have had a single demyelinating episode and thereby confirm the diagnosis more quickly." Further revisions were issued in 2005.

== 2013 revision ==
The 1996 definition of the clinical courses of MS (phenotypes) was updated on 2013 by an international panel (International Advisory Committee on Clinical Trials).

While the main classification in 1996 was the recovery from the attacks (this clinical feature separates relapsing remitting (RR) from progressive), in the updated revision the main classification is the activity.

MS courses in the new revision are divided into active and non-active, and CIS, when is active on MRI, becomes a kind of RRMS (this, of course, must be retrospectively diagnosed after the CDMS conversion)

Some reviews describe CIS as "the prodromal stage of MS".

=== CIS and conversion to MS ===
Before the 2010 McDonald criteria, when it was not possible to prove dissemination of the lesions in space and time, the condition was called CIS and was considered outside the MS spectrum. As soon as dissemination was clear (a second lesion development) the situation was called "Conversion to MS".

The 2010 revision of the McDonald criteria allows the diagnosis of MS with only one proved lesion (CIS). Therefore, the 2013 revision of the phenotypes for the disease course, consistently, included CIS as one of the clinical phenotypes of MS.

Therefore the former expression "conversion from CIS to MS", which is still in use, should be redefined consistently with the former changes, since CIS now is inside MS.
