= Clinical case definition =

Determining if an illness is included in an outbreak investigation

In epidemiology, a clinical case definition, a clinical definition, or simply a case definition lists the clinical criteria by which public health professionals determine whether a person's illness is included as a case in an outbreak investigation—that is, whether a person is considered directly affected by an outbreak. Absent an outbreak, case definitions are used in the surveillance of public health in order to categorize those conditions present in a population (e.g., incidence and prevalence).

== How are they used ==
A case definition defines a case by placing limits on time, person, place, and shared definition with data collection of the phenomenon being studied. Time criteria may include all cases of a disease identified from, for example, January 1, 2008 to March 1, 2008. Person criteria may include age, gender, ethnicity, and clinical characteristics such as symptoms (e.g. cough and fever) and the results of clinical tests (e.g. pneumonia on chest X-ray). Place criteria will usually specify a geographical entity such as a town, state, or country, but may be as small as an institution, a school class, or a restaurant meal session. Shared definition of the phenomenon impacts the study methods and ensures terminology is used in a consistent manner.

Case definitions are often used to label individuals as suspect, probable, or confirmed cases. For example, in the investigation of an outbreak of pneumococcal pneumonia in a nursing home the case definition may be specified as:

- Suspect Case: All residents of Nursing Home A with onset of cough and fever between January 1, 2008 and February 1, 2008.
- Probable Case: Meet the suspect case definition plus have pneumonia on chest X-ray.
- Confirmed Case: Meet the probable case definition plus have pneumococcal infection confirmed by blood culture or other isolation of pneumococci from normally sterile site.

By creating a case definition, public health professionals are better equipped to study an outbreak and determine possible causes.

As investigations proceed, a case definition may be expanded or narrowed, a characteristic of the dynamic nature of outbreak investigations. At any given time, the case definition is supposed to be the gold standard to diagnose a given disease. A sensitive case definition, often applied early in an outbreak, will capture all cases, but will include many non-cases. A specific case definition, usually applied after the outbreak is considered more well understood, will exclude most non-cases, but will also exclude some actual cases.

== Diagnostic criteria ==
The term diagnostic criteria designates a case definition with a specific combination of signs, symptoms, and test results that the clinician uses to attempt to determine the correct diagnosis.

Clinical case definitions cannot be applied without the consideration of diagnostic criteria, which include clinical symptoms, serological tests, and epidemiological perspectives.. Diagnostic criteria also rely heavily on the sensitivity-specificity trade-off. When the diagnostic criteria are too broad, there is high sensitivity, and the number of Type I errors, or false positives, increases. When the diagnosis criteria are structured too broadly, there is a high sensitivity, and the quantity of Type II errors or false negatives increases. Should the diagnosis criteria be different regionally or internationally, the compiled data influencing outbreak tracking may be distorted.

Some examples of diagnostic criteria are:

- Amsterdam criteria for hereditary nonpolyposis colorectal cancer
- McDonald criteria for multiple sclerosis
- ACR criteria for systemic lupus erythematosus

== Clinical definitions ==
When diagnostic criteria are universally accepted they can be considered a "clinical definition" because they define the limits of the affected population, determining which patients are inside and outside of the set.

A clinical definition should be regarded as a statistical analysis tool, and not a substitute for a pathological definition when this is required. Posthumous diagnosis allows to establish the sensitivity and specificity of the clinical definitions.

== See also ==
- Public Health
- Epidemiology
- Outbreak
- Sensitivity and specificity
- Diagnostic criteria
