= W. Ian McDonald =

New Zealand neurologist

William Ian McDonald (15 March 1933 – 13 December 2006) was a New Zealand neurologist and academic. Having taught and practiced in New Zealand and the United States, he was a Professor of Neurology at the Institute of Neurology, located at the University of London, England, from 1974 to 1998. He was the world leading authority on multiple sclerosis (MS) in the second half of the twentieth century: the McDonald criteria used to diagnose MS are named after him.

He earned his Bachelor of Medical Science degree at the University of Otago in Dunedin in 1955, Bachelor of Medicine and Bachelor of Surgery degrees with Distinction in 1957, and his Doctor of Philosophy degree in 1962. McDonald's doctoral thesis dealt with experimental neuropathy in cats induced by diphtheria toxin. It was conducted at the Department of Physiology under the supervision of Archie McIntyre.

He lectured widely, both in the United Kingdom and elsewhere. He was elected as a Fellow of the Royal Australian College of Physicians in 1968, Fellow of the Royal College of Physicians in 1972, Fellow of the Royal College of Ophthalmologists in 1989, and Fellow of the Academy of Medical Sciences in 1999. Accolades for his work included 15 prizes for multiple sclerosis research, a dozen honorary fellowships, and honorary membership of 10 overseas neurological associations.
