= GFUS =

Protein-coding gene in the species Homo sapiens

Identifiers
- Aliases: GFUS, FX, P35B, SDR4E1, tissue specific transplantation antigen P35B, TSTA3, GDP-L-fucose synthase
- External IDs: OMIM: 137020; MGI: 98857; GeneCards: GFUS
Available structures
PDB	Ortholog search: PDBe RCSB
PDB	List of PDB id codes 4B8W, 4BKP, 4E5Y, 4B8Z, 4BL5
Enzyme activity
EC #	BRENDA	ExPASy	KEGG	MetaCyc
1.1.1.271	↗	↗	↗	↗

Gene location (Human)
Chr.	Chromosome 8 (human)
Band	8q24.3	Start	143,612,618 bp
Band	8q24.3	End	143,618,048 bp

Gene location (Mouse)
Chr.	Chromosome 15 (mouse)
Band	15 D3|15 35.1 cM	Start	75,796,525 bp
Band	15 D3|15 35.1 cM	End	75,801,681 bp
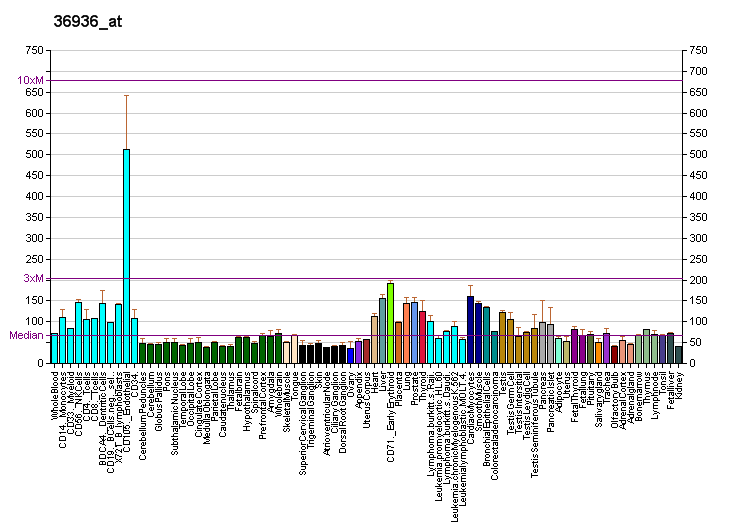

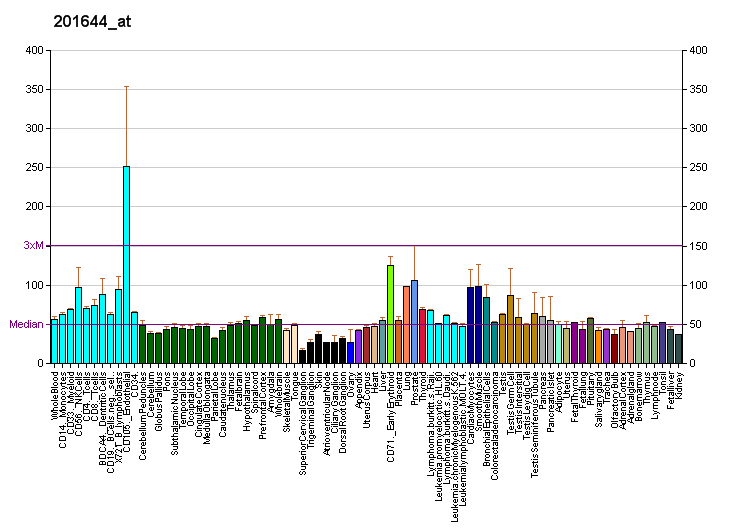
RNA expression pattern
Bgee	Human / Mouse (ortholog); Top expressed in: body of stomach; skin of abdomen; mucosa of esophagus; duodenum; skin of leg; salivary gland; minor salivary glands; body of pancreas; mucosa of transverse colon; fundus / Top expressed in: Paneth cell; crypt of lieberkuhn of small intestine; pyloric antrum; large intestine; colon; lacrimal gland; motor neuron; duodenum; seminal vesicula; facial motor nucleus; More reference expression data
BioGPS	More reference expression data
Gene ontology
Molecular function	electron transfer activity; GDP-4-dehydro-D-rhamnose reductase activity; catalytic activity; oxidoreductase activity; GDP-L-fucose synthase activity; isomerase activity; identical protein binding; GDP-mannose 3,5-epimerase activity
Cellular component	extracellular exosome; cytosol; cytoplasm
Biological process	GDP-mannose metabolic process; leukocyte cell-cell adhesion; metabolism; cytolysis; 'de novo' GDP-L-fucose biosynthetic process; nucleotide-sugar biosynthetic process; electron transport chain; T cell mediated cytotoxicity
Sources:Amigo / QuickGO
Orthologs
Databases	NCBI: entry; OMA: entry
Species	Human	Mouse
Entrez	7264	22122
Ensembl	ENSG00000104522; ENSG00000278243	ENSMUSG00000022570
UniProt	Q13630	P23591
RefSeq (mRNA)	NM_003313; NM_001317783	NM_031201; NM_001357005
RefSeq (protein)	NP_001304712; NP_003304	NP_112478; NP_001343934
Location (UCSC)	Chr 8: 143.61 – 143.62 Mb	Chr 15: 75.8 – 75.8 Mb
PubMed search
- Wikidata
View/Edit Human	View/Edit Mouse

GDP-L-fucose synthase is an enzyme that in humans is encoded by the GFUS gene (previously TSTA3).

As its name suggests, the GFUS protein functions as a GDP-L-fucose synthase. As part of this, it binds to NADP(H). It catalyzes the two-step epimerase and the reductase reactions in GDP-D-mannose metabolism, converting GDP-4-keto-6-D-deoxymannose to GDP-L-fucose. GDP-L-fucose is the substrate of several fucosyltransferases involved in the expression of many glycoconjugates, including blood group ABH antigens and developmental adhesion antigens. Mutations in this gene may cause leukocyte adhesion deficiency, type II.
