= GDP-L-fucose synthase =

Identifiers
- EC no.: 1.1.1.271

Databases
- BRENDA: enzyme data
- ExPASy: NiceZyme view
- KEGG: enzyme entry
- MetaCyc: metabolic pathway
- Rhea: reactions
- PDB structures: RCSB PDB PDBe PDBsum
- Gene Ontology: AmiGO / QuickGO
Search
- PMC: articles
- PubMed: articles
- NCBI: proteins

In enzymology, a GDP-L-fucose synthase (EC 1.1.1.271) is an enzyme that catalyzes the chemical reaction

GDP-4-dehydro-6-deoxy-D-mannose + NADPH + H^{+} $\rightleftharpoons$ GDP-L-fucose + NADP^{+}

Thus, the three substrates of this enzyme are GDP-4-dehydro-6-deoxy-D-mannose, NADPH, and H^{+}, whereas its two products are GDP-L-fucose and NADP^{+}.

In humans, this reaction is catalyzed by the enzyme encoded by the GFUS gene. This enzyme belongs to the family of oxidoreductases, specifically those acting on the CH-OH group of donor with NAD^{+} or NADP^{+} as acceptor. The systematic name of this enzyme class is GDP-L-fucose:NADP^{+} 4-oxidoreductase (3,5-epimerizing). This enzyme is also called GDP-4-keto-6-deoxy-D-mannose-3,5-epimerase-4-reductase. This enzyme participates in fructose and mannose metabolism.

== Relevance in diseases ==
It has been reported that some cases of multiple sclerosis that present the HLA variant DRB3, present also autoimmunity against GDP-L-fucose synthase. The same report points out that the autoimmune problem could derive from the gut microbiota.

== See also ==
- Guanosine diphosphate
- Guanosine diphosphate mannose
