= TPPP =

Protein-coding gene in the species Homo sapiens

Identifiers
- Aliases: TPPP, TPPP/p25, TPPP1, p24, p25, p25alpha, tubulin polymerization promoting protein
- External IDs: OMIM: 608773; MGI: 1920198; GeneCards: TPPP

Gene location (Human)
| Chr. | Chromosome 5 (human) |
| Band | 5p15.33 | Start | 659,862 bp |
| Band | 5p15.33 | End | 693,352 bp |

Gene location (Mouse)
| Chr. | Chromosome 13 (mouse) |
| Band | 13|13 C1 | Start | 74,157,526 bp |
| Band | 13|13 C1 | End | 74,183,872 bp |
RNA expression pattern
| Bgee | Human / Mouse (ortholog); Top expressed in: Brodmann area 23; middle temporal gyrus; postcentral gyrus; internal globus pallidus; entorhinal cortex; inferior ganglion of vagus nerve; superior frontal gyrus; ventral tegmental area; superior vestibular nucleus; subthalamic nucleus / Top expressed in: primary motor cortex; ventral tegmental area; cingulate gyrus; piriform cortex; dentate gyrus; dentate gyrus of hippocampal formation granule cell; superior colliculus; lateral hypothalamus; subiculum; suprachiasmatic nucleus; More reference expression data |
| BioGPS | n/a |
Gene ontology
| Molecular function | microtubule binding; protein binding; tubulin binding |
| Cellular component | cytoplasm; perinuclear region of cytoplasm; myelin sheath; microtubule; cytoskeleton; nucleus; mitochondrion; cytosol; microtubule bundle |
| Biological process | microtubule polymerization; positive regulation of protein-containing complex assembly; positive regulation of protein polymerization; microtubule bundle formation |
Sources:Amigo / QuickGO
Orthologs
| Databases | NCBI: entry; OMA: entry |
| Species | Human | Mouse |
| Entrez | 11076 | 72948 |
| Ensembl | ENSG00000171368 | ENSMUSG00000021573 |
| UniProt | O94811 | Q7TQD2 |
| RefSeq (mRNA) | NM_007030 | NM_182839 |
| RefSeq (protein) | NP_008961 | NP_878259 |
| Location (UCSC) | Chr 5: 0.66 – 0.69 Mb | Chr 13: 74.16 – 74.18 Mb |
| PubMed search |
- Wikidata
| View/Edit Human | View/Edit Mouse |

Tubulin polymerization-promoting protein is a protein that in humans is encoded by the TPPP gene.

This protein has been linked to multiple sclerosis myelin lesions and CSF abnormalities in multiple sclerosis patients.

This has also been linked to Parkinson's and Alzheimer's Disease
