= Frederik Barkhof =

Dutch neuroradiologist

- Born: February 2, 1962 (age 64); Amsterdam, Netherlands
- Known for: Barkhof Criteria

Academic background
- Education: MD, 1988, PhD, 1992, VU University Medical Center
- Thesis: Gadolinium enhanced magnetic resonance imaging in multiple sclerosis (1992)

Frederik Barkhof (born February 2, 1962) is a neuroradiologist. He led the development of the Barkhof Criteria for using MRI findings to predict conversion to clinically definite multiple sclerosis.

== Early life and education ==
Barkhof was born on February 2, 1962, in Amsterdam, Netherlands. He completed his medical degree at VU University Medical Center in 1988 and his PhD in 1992. Upon defending his thesis, he received the Philips Prize for Radiology and the Lucien Appel Prize for Neuroradiology.

== Career ==
Upon graduating, Barkhof joined the Department of Diagnostic Radiology at Vrije Universiteit Amsterdam and co-published Comparison of MRI criteria at first presentation to predict conversion to clinically definite multiple sclerosis in 1997. This led to the development of the Barkhof Criteria for using MRI findings to predict conversion to clinically definite multiple sclerosis (MS). Following this publication, he became a Full Professor in Neuroradiology at Vrije's Department of Radiology and Nuclear Medicine and served as a senior staff member of their MS Center Amsterdam. By 2004, the Barkhof criteria was accepted into the new multiple sclerosis diagnostic criteria because of its high specificity for predicting conversion to multiple sclerosis.

Barkhof left Vrije Universiteit Amsterdam in 2015 to accept an appointment as Professor of Neuroradiology at the University College London. As a result of his academic work, Barkhof was awarded the 2018 John Dystel Prize by the National Multiple Sclerosis Society and the American Academy of Neurology "for his outstanding contribution to multiple sclerosis research in the understanding, treatment and prevention of multiple sclerosis." Following this, he also received a Gold Medal from the International Society for Magnetic Resonance in Medicine for his contributions to MRI research. In 2018 and 2020 Barkhof was listed by Thompson-Reuters as one of the top 3000 most influential scientists world-wide.
