= Poser criteria =

- Purpose: Diagnostic criteria for multiple sclerosis

The Poser criteria are diagnostic criteria for multiple sclerosis (MS). They replaced the older Schumacher criteria. They have in turn been superseded by the McDonald criteria. Nevertheless, some of the concepts introduced have remained in MS research, like CDMS (clinical definite MS), and newer criteria are often calibrated against them. The criteria were unveiled in the Annals of Neurology in 1983 by a team led by Dr. Charles M. Poser.

The article that introduced them also defined the concepts of attack, historical information, clinical evidence, paraclinical evidence, lesion typical of MS, remission, separate lesions and laboratory support, which are necessary to apply the criteria.

The criteria considers MS as the presence of demyelinating lesions disseminated in time and space, and they are oriented specially to prove the dissemination. Based on this, the authors defined a set of rules that can yield five conclusions: CDMS, LSDMS, CPMS, LSPMS or noMS. Poser diagnosis of CDMS is known to have a sensitivity of 87% respect postmortem autopsy examination

== Definitions ==
Poser et al. define several concepts. The most important for diagnosis are:

- Attack: Occurrence of a symptom of neurological dysfunction for more than 24 hours
- Clinical evidence: Neurological dysfunction demonstrable by neurological examination
- Paraclinical evidence: Demonstration by any test of the existence of a non-clinical lesion in the CNS

== Diagnosis conclusions ==
The criteria can yield five conclusions:

1. CDMS – Clinically definite MS. Needs two attacks and some clinical or paraclinical evidences
2. LSDMS – Laboratory supported definite MS, showing oligoclonal bands and clinical or paraclinical evidences
3. CPMS – Clinically probable MS, with less restrict combinations.
4. LSPMS – Laboratory supported probable MS. Only two attacks is enough to enter this category
5. No MS – There is no clinical evidence of having MS.

== Summary of requirements ==
Any of the five conclusions have subpossibilities. Here a table is shown with each one of them:

Diagnosis conclusion	Clinical Presentation	Additional Data Needed
CDMS	* Two or more attacks (relapses)	Two clinical evidence One clinical and one paraclinical evidence
LSDMS	* At least one attack and oligoclonal bands	Two attacks and one evidence (clinical or paraclinical); One attack and two clinical evidences One attack, one clinical and one paraclinical evidences
CPMS	* At least one attack	Two attacks and one clinical evidence One attack and two clinical evidences One attack, one clinical and one paraclinical evidences
LSPMS	* Two attacks	No more evidence is required

If none of these requirements is accomplished, the diagnosis is "No MS", meaning that there is not enough clinical evidence to support a clinical diagnosis of MS.

== Sensitivity and specificity ==
Poser diagnosis of CDMS was initially reported to have a sensitivity of 87% respect postmortem autopsy examination. Poser criteria were published in 1983 and their sensitivity increased with time. For example, in 1988 a 94% specificity vs. postmortem analysis was reported Anyway, in initial cases, the sensitivity was low respect pathologically defined MS because around 25% of MS cases are silent MS cases.

Two pathologically disseminated inflammatory demyelinating lesions should be considered MS even if they are silent. Therefore, Poser criteria should be considered as deprecated.

== Extension of the concepts ==
As more knowledge about the underlying pathology of MS has been gathered, the concepts of subclinical, preclinical and CIS have been used together with the Poser original classification.

The first manifestation of MS is the so-called clinically isolated syndrome, or CIS, which is the first isolated attack. The Poser diagnosis criteria for MS does not allow doctors normally to give an MS diagnosis until a second attack takes place. Therefore, the concept of "clinical MS", for a MS that can be diagnosed is sometimes too strong because until MS diagnosis has been established, nobody can tell whether the disease dealing with is MS.

Cases of MS before the CIS are sometimes found during other neurological inspections and are referred to as "subclinical MS". "Preclinical MS" refers to cases after the CIS but before the confirming second attack. After the second confirming attack the situation is referred to as CDMS (clinically defined multiple sclerosis).
