= Robert Carswell (pathologist) =

Scottish pathologist (1793–1857)

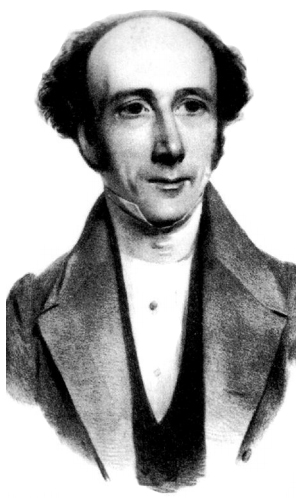
- Born: 3 February 1793; Paisley, Scotland
- Died: 15 June 1857 (aged 64)
- Education: University of Glasgow

Sir Robert Carswell (3 February 1793 – 15 June 1857) was a Scottish professor of pathology, who described and illustrated many of the clinical details of multiple sclerosis but did not identify it as a separate disease.

== Life ==
Carswell was born in Paisley, Scotland, on 3 February 1793, and studied medicine at the University of Glasgow. While a student he employed by Dr. John Thompson of Edinburgh to make a collection of drawings illustrating morbid anatomy. He travelled to the continent, and spent two years (1822–3) working at the hospitals of Paris and Lyon, while working on this collection. He returned to Scotland, and took his degree of M.D. at Marischal College, Aberdeen, in 1826. After this he went again to Paris, and resumed his studies in morbid anatomy under Pierre Charles Alexandre Louis.

Around 1828 Carswell was chosen by University College London as professor of pathological anatomy; but before entering on his teaching duties was commissioned to prepare a collection of pathological drawings. He therefore remained in Paris after receiving this commission till 1831, when he had completed a series of two thousand water-colour drawings of diseased structures. He then took the duties of his professorship. At the same time, or soon afterwards, he became physician to the University College Hospital.

About 1836 Carswell took up private medical practice, but did not meet with great success. In poor health, he in 1840 resigned his professorship, and was appointed physician to the Leopold I of Belgium and his royal family. He lived at Laeken, near Brussels, making several journeys to the south in search of health. Carswell made no further contributions to medical science. He was knighted in July 1850 by Queen Victoria for his services to Louis-Philippe I when an exile in the United Kingdom. He died on 15 June 1857, of chronic lung disease. He married Marguerite Chardenot, who survived him, but left no issue.

== Works ==
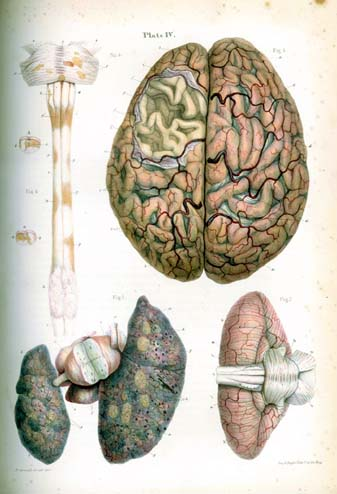
One of the illustrations from Illustrations of the Elementary Forms of Disease

Carswell's major work, published in 1837, was Illustrations of the Elementary Forms of Disease, with coloured plates. He wrote also journal articles, and in the Cyclopædia of Practical Medicine the articles "Induration", "Melanosis", "Mortification", "Perforation", "Scirrhus", "Softening", and "Tubercle".

== Collections ==
Carswell's pathological drawings were commissioned by University College London and now reside in their Special Collections department. The Carswell Drawings collection contains over 1000 artworks and 3 boxes of manuscript material. The majority of these images have been digitised and are publicly available to view online.
