= Oligoclonal band =

Marker in blood/cerebrospinal fluid testing

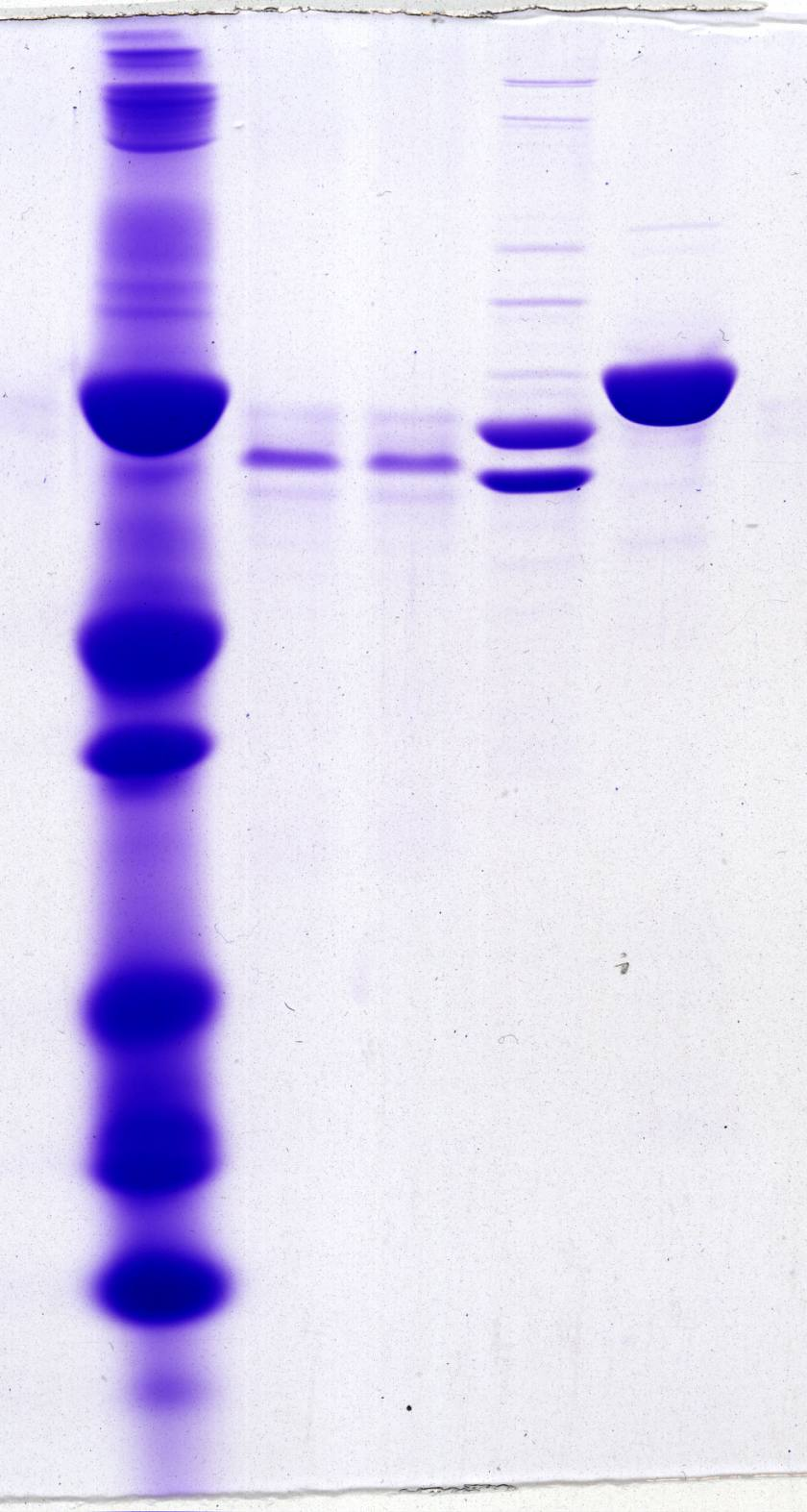
Proteins separated by SDS-PAGE, Coomassie brilliant blue staining

Oligoclonal bands (OCBs) are bands of immunoglobulins observed in a patient's blood serum, or cerebrospinal fluid (CSF) for the diagnosis of various neurological and blood diseases. Oligoclonal bands are present in the CSF of more than 95% of patients with clinically definite multiple sclerosis.

Two methods of analysis are possible: (a) protein electrophoresis, a method of analyzing the composition of fluids, also known as "SDS-PAGE (sodium dodecyl sulphate polyacrylamide gel electrophoresis)/Coomassie blue staining", and (b) the combination of isoelectric focusing/silver staining. The latter is more sensitive.

For the analysis of cerebrospinal fluid, a sample is first collected via lumbar puncture (LP). Normally it is assumed that all the proteins that appear in the CSF, but are not present in the serum, are produced intrathecally (inside the central nervous system). Therefore, analysts usually subtract bands in serum from bands in CSF when investigating CNS diseases. The comparative sample of blood serum is usually obtained from a clotted blood sample around the same time as the LP.

== Oligoclonal bands in multiple sclerosis ==
OCBs are especially important for multiple sclerosis (MS). In MS, normally only OCBs made of immunoglobulin G antibodies are considered, though sometimes other proteins can be taken into account, like lipid-specific immunoglobulin M. The presence of these IgM OCBs is associated with a more severe course.

Typically for an OCB analysis, the CSF is concentrated and the serum is diluted. After this dilution/concentration prealbumin appears as higher on CSF. Albumin is typically the dominant band on both fluids. Transferrin is another prominent protein on CSF column because its small molecular size easily increases its filtration in to CSF. CSF has a relatively higher concentration of prealbumin than does serum. As expected large molecular proteins are absent in CSF column. After all these bands are localized, OCBs should be assessed in the γ region which normally hosts small group of polyclonal immunoglobulins.

New techniques like "capillary isoelectric focusing immunoassay" are able to detect IgG OCBs in more than 95% of multiple sclerosis patients.

Even more than 12 OCBs can appear in MS. Each one of them represent antibody proteins (or protein fragments) secreted by plasma cells, although why exactly these bands are present, and which proteins these bands represent, has not yet been fully elucidated. The target antigens for these antibodies are not easy to find because it requires to isolate a single kind of protein in each band, though new techniques are able to do so.

In 40% of MS patients with OCBs, antibodies specific to the viruses HHV-6 and EBV have been found.

HHV-6 specific OCBs have also been found in other demyelinating diseases. A lytic protein of HHV-6A virus was identified as the target of HHV-6 specific oligoclonal bands.

Though early theories assumed that the OCBs were somehow pathogenic autoantigens, recent research has shown that the IgG present in the OCBs are antibodies against debris, and therefore, OCBs seem to be just a secondary effect of MS. Nevertheless, OCBs remain useful as a biomarker.

=== Diagnostic value in MS ===
Oligoclonal bands are an important indicator in the diagnosis of multiple sclerosis. Up to 95% of all patients with multiple sclerosis have observable oligoclonal bands at least for those with European ancestry. The last available reports in 2017 were pointing to a sensitivity of 98% and specificity of 87% for differential diagnosis versus MS mimickers (specificity respect unselected population should be equal or higher).

Another application for OCBs is patient classification. OCB-negative MS patients tend to have a slower evolution. Some reports point that the underlying condition that causes the MS lesions in these patients is different. There are four pathological patterns of damage, and in the majority of patients with pattern II and III brain lesions oligoclonal bands are absent or only transiently present.

=== Heterogeneity ===
It has been reported that oligoclonal bands are nearly absent in patients with pattern II and pattern III lesion types.

Six groups of patients are usually separated, based on OCBs:

- type 1, no bands in CSF and serum;
- type 2, oligoclonal IgG bands in CSF,
- type 3, oligoclonal bands in CSF and serum with additional bands in CSF;
- type 4, identical oligoclonal bands in CSF and serum,
- type 5, monoclonal bands in CSF and serum,
- type 6, presence of a single band limited to the CSF.

Type 2 and 3 indicate intrathecal synthesis, and the rest are considered as negative results (No MS).

=== Alternatives ===
The main importance of oligoclonal bands was to demonstrate the production of intrathecal immunoglobins (IgGs) for establishing a MS diagnosis. Currently alternative methods for detection of this intrathecal synthesis have been published, and therefore it has lost some of its importance in this area.

A specially interesting method are free light chains (FLC), specially the kappa-FLCs (kFLCs). Several authors have reported that the nephelometric and ELISA FLCs determination is comparable with OCBs as markers of IgG synthesis, and kFLCs behave even better than oligoclonal bands.

Another alternative to oligoclonal bands for MS diagnosis is the MRZ-reaction (MRZR), a polyspecific antiviral immune response against the viruses of measles, rubella and zoster found in 1992.

In some reports the MRZR showed a lower sensitivity than OCB (70% vs. 100%), but a higher specificity (92% vs. 69%) for MS.

== Bands in other diseases ==
The presence of one band (a monoclonal band) may be considered serious, such as lymphoproliferative disease, or may simply be normal—it must be interpreted in the context of each specific patient. More bands may reflect the presence of a disease.

=== Diseases associated ===
Oligoclonal bands may be found in:

- Multiple sclerosis
- Lyme disease
- Neuromyelitis optica (Devic's disease)
- Systemic lupus erythematosus
- Neurosarcoidosis
- Subacute sclerosing panencephalitis
- Subarachnoid hemorrhage
- Syphilis
- Primary central nervous system lymphoma
- Sjögren's syndrome
- Guillain–Barré syndrome
- Meningeal carcinomatosis
- Multiple myeloma
- Parry–Romberg syndrome
