= Multiple sclerosis =

Autoimmune disease

- Other names: Multiple cerebro-spinal sclerosis, disseminated sclerosis, encephalomyelitis disseminata
- Nerve cell with protective myelin sheets, a healthy cell versus one in multiple sclerosis
- Specialty: Neurology
- Symptoms: Vision problems, weakness, tingling or numbness, balance issues, bladder problems
- Usual onset: Age 20–40
- Duration: Long-term
- Risk factors: EBV infection, vitamin D deficiency, female sex
- Diagnostic method: Based on symptoms and medical tests
- Treatment: Disease-modifying treatment and symptom management like physical therapy
- Frequency: 0.038% (world)

Multiple sclerosis (MS) is a chronic and neurodegenerative autoimmune disease in which the immune system attacks myelin, the insulating cover of nerve cells, causing damage to the central nervous system. This impairs the nervous system's ability to transmit signals. Symptoms include double vision, vision loss, eye pain, muscle weakness, loss of coordination, as well as cognitive issues like problems with memory.

MS may be a rare complication of an Epstein-Barr virus (EBV) infection. Genetics and environmental factors like exposure to sunlight also impact the risk of MS. MS can be diagnosed based on symptoms, MRI scans, and sometimes a lumbar puncture to investigate spinal fluid.

There is no cure for MS. Current treatments aim to manage symptoms during acute flares and prevent further attacks with disease-modifying therapies. With effective treatment, it is possible to reduce attacks strongly, but the disease progress is not fully stopped. In addition, symptoms of MS like balance issues can be managed with drugs and with non-drug treatments (e.g. physical therapy). On average, life expectancy is slightly lower than normal.

In 2024, about 3.1 million people were affected by MS globally, with rates much higher further from the equator. The disease usually begins between the ages of 20 and 40 and is almost three times more common in women than in men. MS was first described in 1868 by French neurologist Jean-Martin Charcot.

== Signs and symptoms ==
Main symptoms of multiple sclerosis

The symptoms in MS are highly varied, and depend on which part of the nervous system is damaged. Symptoms include vision problems, weakness, fatigue, problems walking, and numbness. Symptoms sometimes come and go; and are sometimes permanent. Fatigue is one of the most common symptoms. Roughly 65% of people with MS experience fatigue. Of these, some 15–40% report fatigue as their most disabling symptom.

A common early manifestation of MS is inflammation of the optic nerve (optic neuritis), a feature that can also happen repeatedly during relapses. This can cause blurry vision or vision loss and pain with eye movement, either in one eye or in both. Double vision is also possible. MS may also present with eye movement impairments, such as internuclear ophthalmoplegia or sixth nerve palsy.

People can experience difficulty with balance and walking, and may use a wheelchair when MS becomes advanced. In addition, muscles may be weak and spasticity can occur with stiffness and painful spasms. When MS is more advanced, walking difficulties, amongst other symptoms, lead to a higher risk of falling. Sensory symptom include tingling or numbness in the arms and legs, and in the face, as well as loss of sensation. Some people experience a painful or tight band-like feeling around the chest or stomach, sometimes called an MS hug.

Some individuals experience problems with speech: they may talk more slowly, pronounce vowels less accurately, and talk monotonously. Others may experience swallowing difficulties, and bladder and bowel difficulties (such as incontinence or retention) can also be present.

Difficulties in thinking and emotional problems such as depression or unstable mood are also common. The primary deficit in cognitive function that people with MS experience is slowed information-processing speed, with memory also commonly affected, and executive function less commonly. Intelligence, language, and semantic memory are usually preserved, and the level of cognitive impairment varies considerably between people with MS.

Uhthoff's phenomenon, a reversible exacerbation of symptoms following a rise in body temperature, and Lhermitte's sign, an electrical sensation that runs down the back when flexing the neck, are particularly characteristic of MS, although may not always be present. 60–80% of MS patients find that symptoms, such as fatigue, are affected by changes in body temperature.

=== Disease course ===
==== Prodromal phase ====
MS may have a prodromal phase in the years leading up to its manifestation, characterized by psychiatric issues, cognitive impairment, and increased use of healthcare. People later diagnosed with MS may seek healthcare for fatigue, bladder issues, headaches and other pain disorders.

==== Onset ====
85% of cases begin as a clinically isolated syndrome (CIS) over a number of days with 45% having motor or sensory problems, 20% having optic neuritis, and 10% having symptoms related to brainstem dysfunction, while the remaining 25% have more than one of the aforementioned difficulties. With optic neuritis as the most common presenting symptom, people with MS notice sub-acute loss of vision, often associated with pain worsening on eye movement, and reduced color vision. The course of symptoms occurs in two main patterns initially: either as episodes of sudden worsening that last a few days to months (called relapses, exacerbations, bouts, attacks, or flare-ups) followed by improvement (85% of cases) or as a gradual worsening over time without periods of recovery (10–15% of cases).

==== Relapses ====
Relapses are usually unpredictable, occurring without warning. Exacerbations rarely occur more frequently than twice per year. Some relapses, however, are preceded by common triggers and they occur more frequently during spring and summer. Similarly, viral infections such as the common cold, influenza, or gastroenteritis increase their risk. Stress may also raise attack risk modestly, with the strongest evidence for severe stress like war or in PTSD.

Many events do not affect rates of relapse requiring hospitalization including vaccination, breast feeding, physical trauma, and Uhthoff's phenomenon.

==== Pregnancy ====
Many women with MS who become pregnant experience lower symptoms during pregnancy, especially in the third trimester. During the period directly after delivery, the risk increases. Overall, pregnancy does not seem to influence long-term disability.

== Causes ==
MS is an autoimmune disease with a combination of genetic and environmental causes underlying it. Both T cells and B cells are involved. The causes of the disease are not fully understood. The Epstein-Barr Virus (EBV) very strongly increases the risk of MS.

=== Immune dysregulation ===
MS usually begins when immune cells known as T cells and B cells erroneously attack the body's own nervous system by releasing signals that cause inflammation in brain and other neurological tissues. This is supported by the presence of certain antibodies (oligoclonal IgG bands) commonly found in the spinal fluid of people with MS. Although T cells have been considered to be the major contributors to the inflammatory demyelination occurring in MS, recent studies indicate that B cells also play a significant role in the pathogenesis of this disease.

=== Epstein-Barr virus ===
The Epstein-Barr virus (EBV) infects about 90 to 95% of adults and can cause infectious mononucleosis. A study of more than 10 million US military members compared 801 people who developed MS to 1,566 matched controls who did not. The study found a 32-fold increased risk of MS development following EBV infection. It did not find an increased risk after infection with other viruses, including the similar cytomegalovirus. These findings strongly suggest that EBV is necessary for MS onset, although EBV alone may be insufficient to cause it.

The nuclear antigen of EBV, which is the most consistent marker of EBV infection across all strains, has been identified as a direct source of autoreactivity in the human body. These antigens appear more likely to promote autoimmunity in vitamin D deficient persons. The EBV protein EBNA1 shares similarities with three human proteins, including the brain protein GlialCAM. Because of molecular mimicry, the immune system in MS mistakenly may attack these proteins. Two are part of the nervous system, while the third is a "guardian molecule" which protects the body against autoimmunity.

=== Genetics ===
HLA region of chromosome 6: Changes in this area increase the probability of getting MS.

MS is not considered a hereditary disease, but over 200 genetic variants have been shown to increase its risk. The probability of developing MS is higher in relatives of an affected person, with a greater risk among those more closely related. An identical twin of an affected individual has a 30% chance of developing MS, 5% for a nonidentical twin, 2.5% for a sibling, and an even lower chance for a half-sibling. MS is also more common in some ethnic groups than others.

Specific genes linked with MS include differences in the human leukocyte antigen (HLA) system—a group of genes on chromosome 6 that serves as the major histocompatibility complex (MHC). The MHC is involved in how antigens are presented and how abundant different types of T cells are. The MHC allele (genetic variant) HLA-DRB1*15:01 which is present in 30% of the U.S. and Northern European population, produces the strongest association with higher risk of MS. Other allelles related to MHC exhibit a protective effect.

The contribution of HLA variants to MS susceptibility has been known since the 1980s, and it has also been implicated in the development of other autoimmune diseases. Genetic variants in autoimmune diseases are typically linked to T cells, but in MS (and lupus), many are linked to B cells too. In general, MS is associated more closely to autoimmune diseases than to other neurodegenerative diseases.

=== Vitamin D and sunlight ===
Geographic risk distribution of MS

The prevalence of MS shows a geographic gradient: it is more common in people who live farther from the equator (e.g., those who live in northern regions of the world). Exceptions include ethnic groups that are at low risk and that live far from the equator, such as the Sami, Amerindians, Canadian Hutterites, New Zealand Māori, and Canada's Inuit, as well as groups that have a relatively high risk and that live closer to the equator such as Sardinians, inland Sicilians, Palestinians, and Parsi.

The geographical gradient can, at least in part, be explained by exposure to sunlight and resulting vitamin D levels. Vitamin D plays various roles in the immune system, including helping the body get rid of pathogens and regulating immune tolerance. Low vitamin D levels are a risk factor for developing MS and for disease progression beyond the first attack. Sunlight exposure may reduce risk independently from vitamin D.

While there are dietary sources of vitamin D (e.g. fatty fish and some mushrooms), this usually is not enough to meet the body's need. The risk of MS tracks the sunlight exposure in childhood.

=== Other risks ===
Smoking is a risk factor for MS. Similarly, air pollution seems to increase MS risk, as well as the risk of relapses. Organic solvent exposure and night shift work are linked to increased risk of MS, but are not as established as other risk factors. Vaccinations were studied as causal factors; most studies, though, show no association.

The risk of developing MS is also weakly associated with obesity, and the presence of certain bacteria such as Akkermansia muciniphila in the intestines.

== Mechanism ==
Multiple sclerosis is an immune-mediated disease, and generally considered an autoimmune disease, even though there is no single antigen identified. It features inflammation, loss of protective myelin sheaths around nerves, and neurodegeneration. In most individuals, inflammation and neurodegeneration coexist; in the initial stages inflammation dominates, whereas neurodegeneration plays an increasing role over time. The blood–brain barrier gets disrupted during acute inflammatory attacks, allowing B and T cells to enter the brain and attack myelin. Smouldering inflammation can continue after the blood–brain barrier recovers, leading to nerve damage.

The mechanisms causing MS fatigue are not well understood. Direct causes of fatigue likely include inflammation, problems with hormones (e.g. low cortisol), and damage to grey and white matter in the brain. Indirect causes include medication side effects (like pain medication), depression, and insomnia. These sleep problems can in turn be caused by pain, spasticity or medication.

=== Inflammation and lesion formation ===
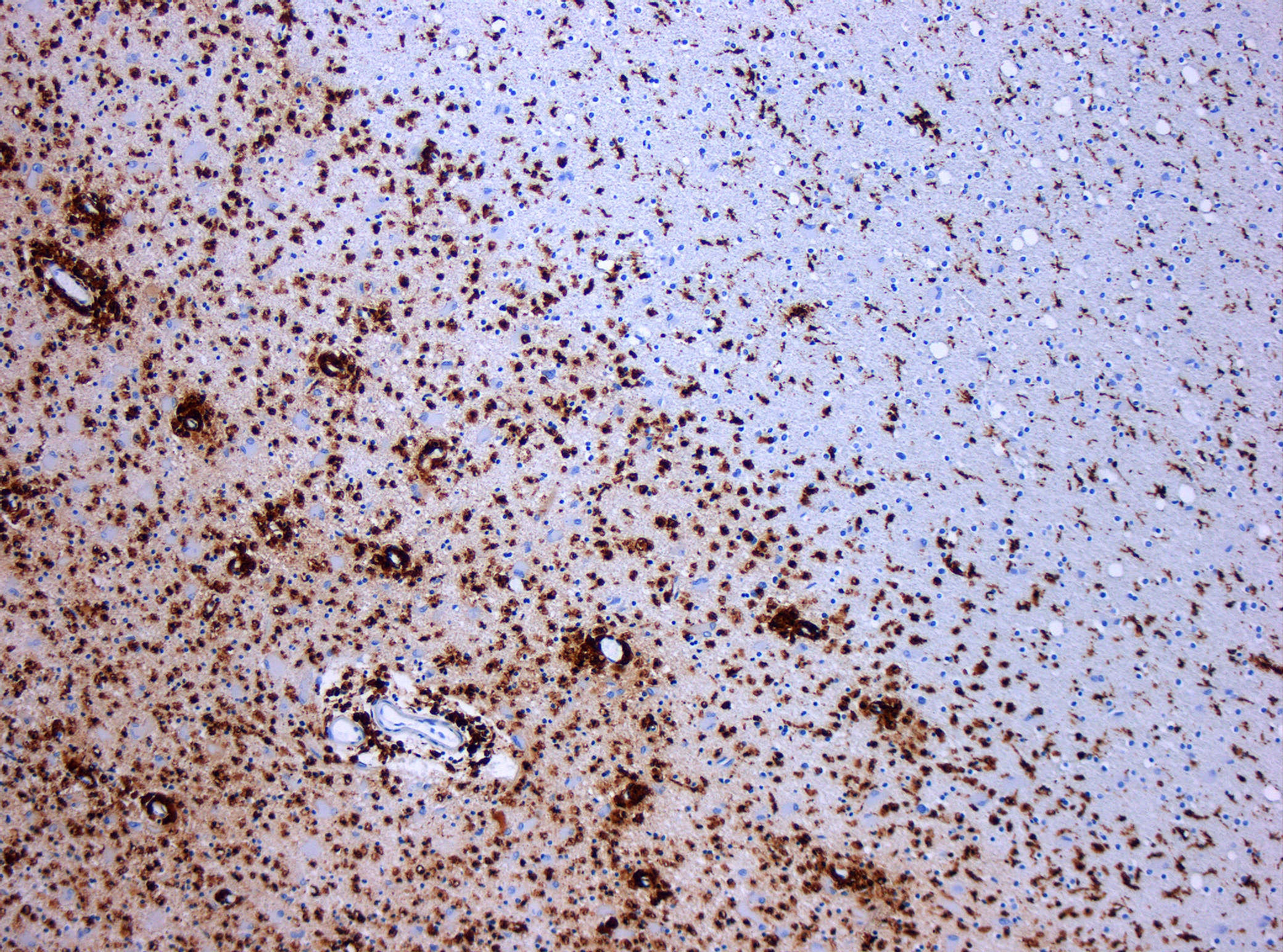
CD68-stained tissue shows several macrophages in the area of a demyelinated lesion caused by MS

For most people, the early phase of MS is characterised by relapses, in which immune cells normally circulating outside of the central nervous system enter the brain and spinal cord. These likely include monocytes, B cells.and different types of T cells, which attack myelin and the cells that create myelin, oligodendrocytes. Myelin forms a protective sheath around the axons of nerve cells and allow communication between nerve cells.

These attacks underlie the formation of scars. The name multiple sclerosis refers to these scars (also known as plaques or lesions). The lesions most commonly affect the white matter in the brain, the optic nerve, spinal cord rich in myelin, but attacks can also affect grey matter.

A repair process, called remyelination, takes place in the early phases of the disease and in younger individuals, but the process is often incomplete.

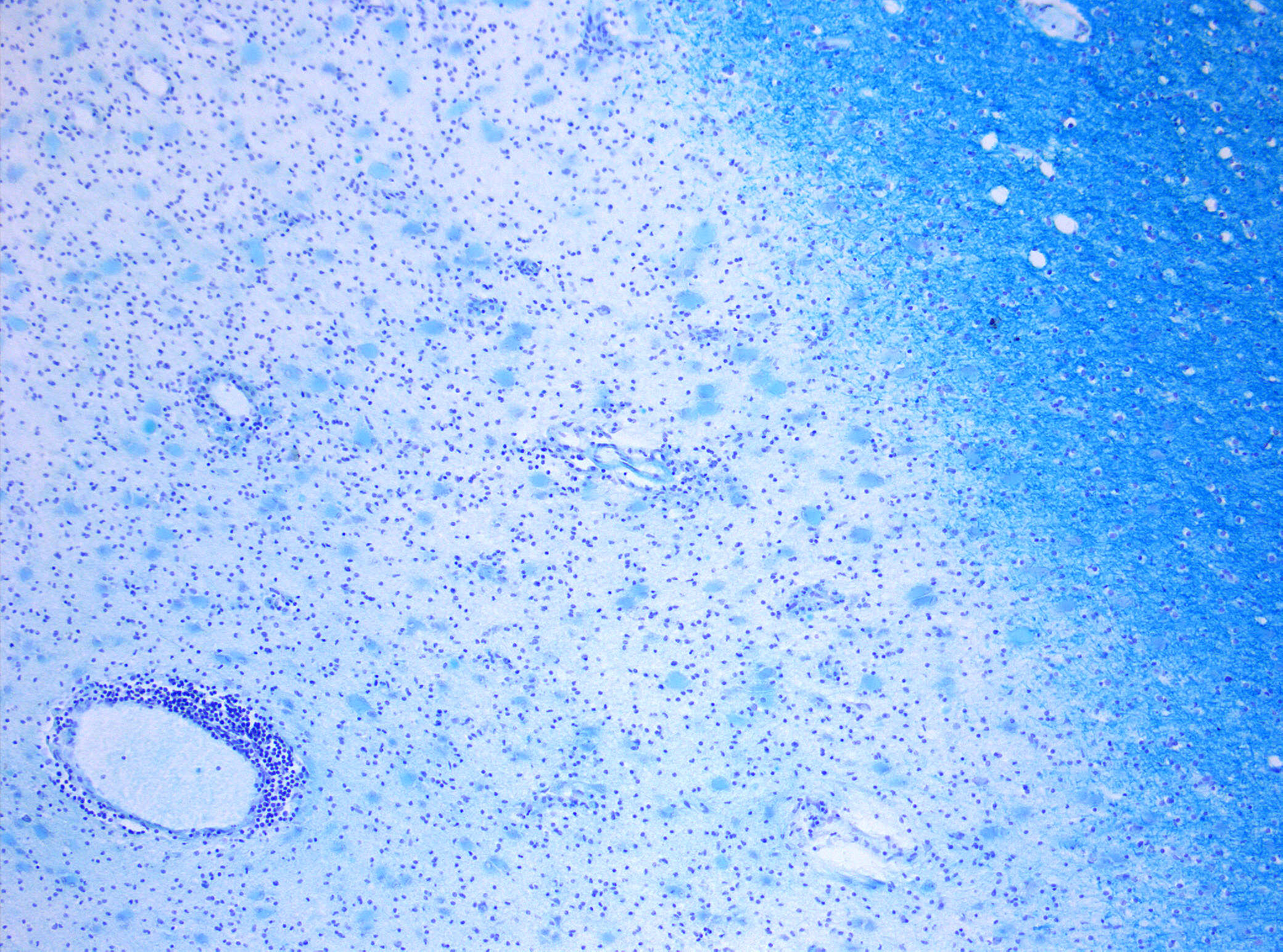
Demyelination in MS: On Klüver-Barrera myelin staining, decoloration in the area of the lesion can be appreciated.

=== Neurodegeneration ===
A significant portion of disability is thought to occur from progression independent of relapse activity (PIRA). This smouldering disease activity is driven by two processes: low-grade inflammation and dysfunction of neurons.

Microglia, a type of immune cell found in the central nervous system, play an important role in the inflammation. Activated microglia release molecules that promote inflammation. These molecules, together with others from B and T cells, drive astrocytes to a state in which they damage the nervous system. Initially, the inflammation drives the dysfunction of neurons, but after some time, it becomes self-sustaining, and can lead to cell death.

== Diagnosis ==
Animation showing dissemination of brain lesions in time and space as demonstrated by monthly MRI studies along a year

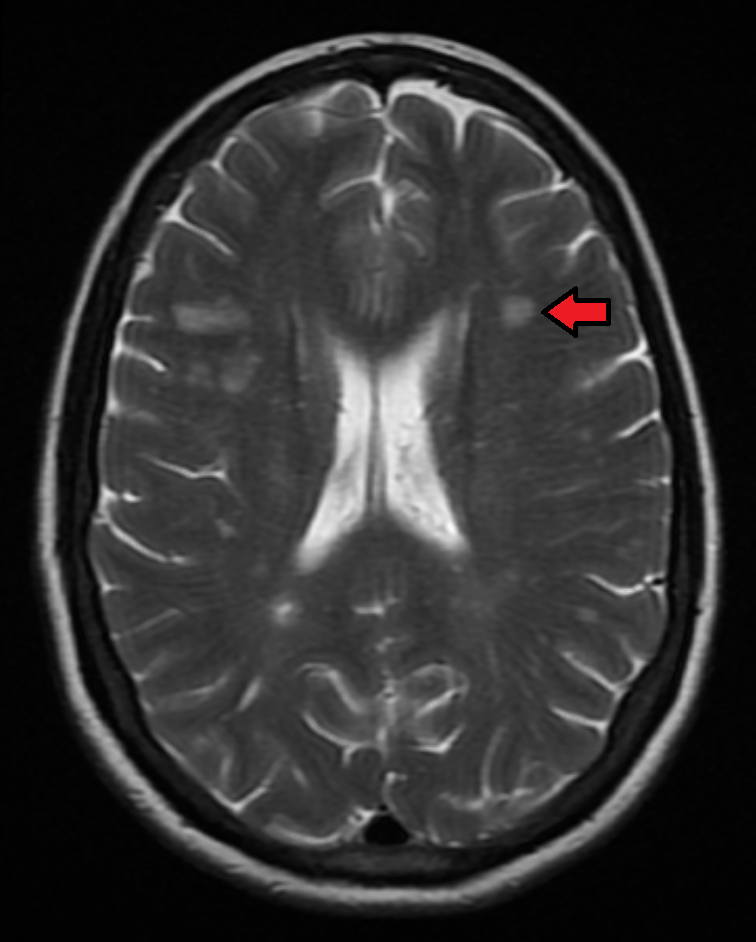
Multiple sclerosis as seen on MRI

Multiple sclerosis is typically diagnosed based on the presenting signs and symptoms and MRI scans, in combination with supporting lab testing of the spinal fluid and measurement of nerve conduction velocities.

=== McDonald criteria ===
The McDonald criteria, which focus on clinical, laboratory, and radiologic evidence of lesions at different times and in different areas, is the most commonly used method of diagnosis.

The 2024 McDonald criteria states that patients with multiple sclerosis should have lesions which are disseminated in space (DIS) and, in many instances, disseminated in time (DIT), i.e. lesions which have appeared in different areas in the brain and at different times.

To show DIS, lesions typically need to be present in two out of five locations: spinal cord, optic nerve and three specific locations in the brain. These lesions can be detected on MRI. The optic nerve lesions can be detected with other tests too, which might be more wide available globally than MRI. For disease that has progressed over a period of 12 months or more, two spinal cord lesions are enough.

DIT can shown in repeat MRIs, among other methods. To reduce delays in diagnosis, DIS is no longer required for a diagnosis of MS. Alternatively, DIS can be combined with specific MRI findings such as the central vein sign to diagnose MS. Finally, DIS can be combined with specific tests of the cerebro-spinal fluid.

As of 2025, no single test (including biopsy) can provide a definitive diagnosis.

=== MRI ===
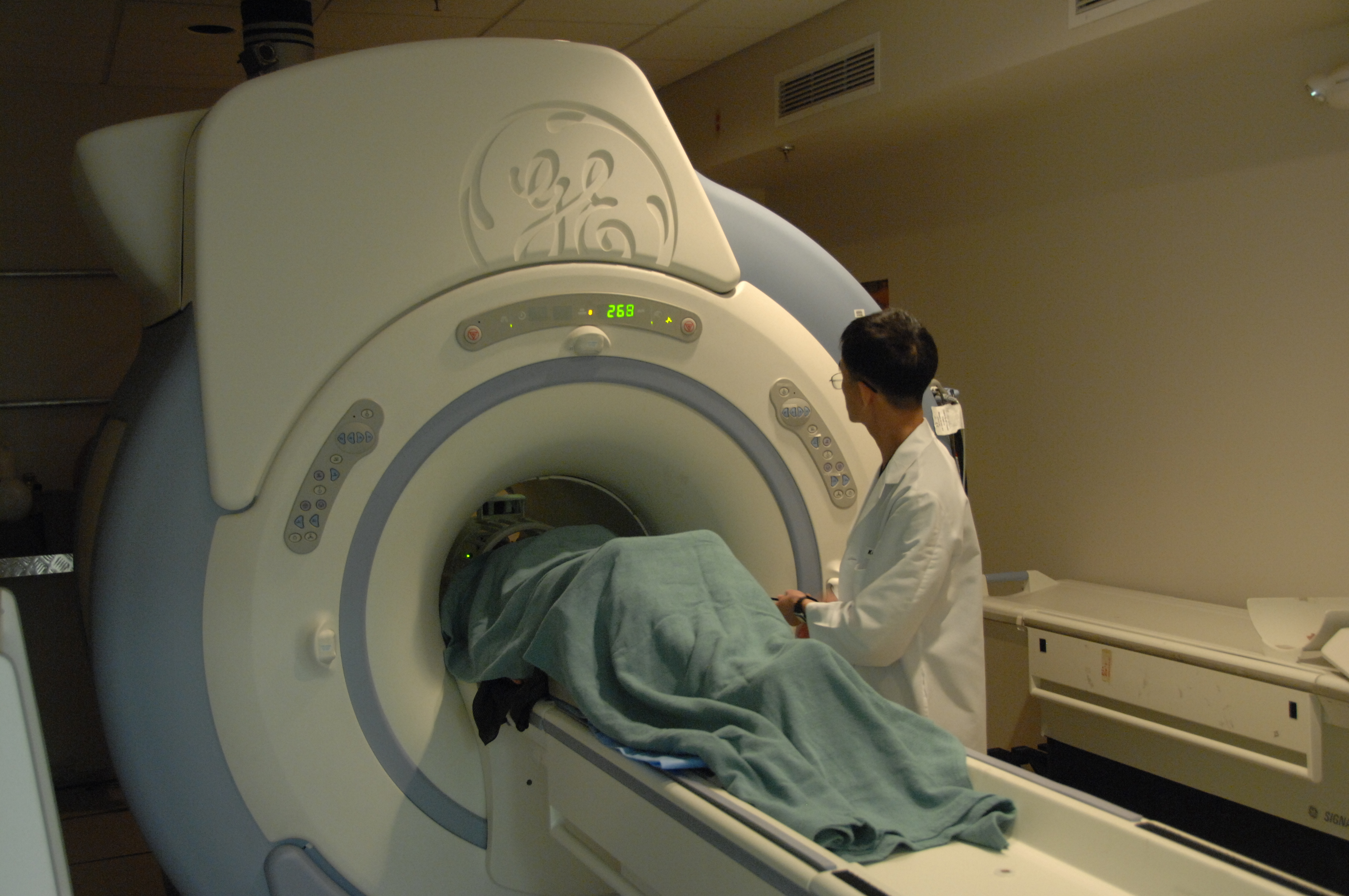
MRI machine used as a tool for MS diagnosis

Magnetic resonance imaging (MRI) of the brain and spine may show areas of demyelination (lesions or plaques). Gadolinium can be administered intravenously as a contrast agent to highlight active plaques, and by elimination, demonstrate the existence of historical lesions not associated with symptoms at the moment of the evaluation.

The central vein sign, which shows as a dark line in the MRI through the bright white lesion, can help verify that the lesions are due to MS. Active MS lesions can have an inactive centre surrounded by microglia which contain iron. In specific MRI scans, these can be visible as paramagnetic rim lesions, which are another way to show that the lesions are likely due to MS.

=== Cerebrospinal fluid (lumbar puncture) ===
Testing of cerebrospinal fluid obtained from a lumbar puncture can provide evidence of chronic inflammation in the central nervous system. Two different biomarkers can show this inflammation with similar accuracy:

- Oligoclonal bands of IgG
- Kappa free-light chain (kFLC) concentrations

The measurement of oligoclonal bands requires specialists labs; it is easier to measure kFLC. These two biomarkers are not only elevated in MS, but also to a lesser extent in other diseases including NMOSD. They can be used instead of dissemination in time to diagnose MS where dissemination in space is demonstrated.

=== Differential diagnosis ===
Several diseases present similarly to MS. Medical professionals use the specific presentation, history, and exam findings to make an individualized differential. Red flags are findings that suggest an alternate diagnosis, although they do not rule out MS. They include individuals being younger than 11 or older than 50, signs of nerve damage outside of the central nervous system, severe vision loss, a very rapid onset, or atypical lab and exam findings.

A very rapid onset may indicate a stroke or seizure rather than MS. Intractable vomiting, severe optic neuritis, or bilateral optic neuritis raises suspicion for neuromyelitis optica spectrum disorder (NMOSD). Infectious diseases that may look similar to multiple sclerosis include HIV, Lyme disease, and syphilis. Autoimmune diseases include neurosarcoidosis, lupus, Guillain-Barré syndrome, acute disseminated encephalomyelitis, and Behçet's disease. Psychiatric conditions such as anxiety may also present in a similar way. Other rare diseases on the differential include CNS lymphoma, congenital leukodystrophies, and anti-MOG-associated myelitis.

MS is frequently misdiagnosed and underdiagnosed. Migraine and stroke can look similar on MRIs, and those are the two most frequent subsequent correct diagnoses for people incorrectly diagnosed with MS. In underdiagnosis, people often get a psychiatric or orthopedic diagnosis when they should have been diagnosed with MS.

== Types and variants ==
MS progression types. From bottom to top: RRMS, PPMS, SPMS.

Several disease courses (or types) of MS have been described. They are used to help predict the progression of MS for individuals, for clinical trials and for decisions on what medications to use. The International Advisory Committee on Clinical Trials of MS classifies MS courses into four disease courses in what is known as the Lublin-Reingold classification:

1. Relapsing-remitting MS (RRMS)
2. Primary progressive MS (PPMS)
3. Secondary progressive MS (SPMS)
4. Clinically isolated syndrome (CIS)

One other type is sometimes recognised

5. Radiologically isolated syndrome

CIS is a first episode of MS signs and symptoms, followed by a full or almost full recovery. To be classified as CIS, the attack must last at least a full day and be due to demyelination or inflammation of the central nervous system. Individuals with CIS can in some cases be diagnosed directly with MS, if they meet more strict criteria compared to people with a history of attacks. Radiologically isolated syndrome is diagnosed when an MRI for an unrelated issue shows MS-like lesions. Similarly, people can be diagnosed with MS if they meet more strict criteria.

RRMS is characterized by unpredictable relapses followed by periods of weeks to years of relative quiet (remission). Deficits that occur during attacks may either resolve fully or leave some problems. In between attacks, there is often silent progression of the disease (progression independent of relapse activity). RRMS describes the initial course of 85% of individuals with MS.

RRMS can sometimes develop into SPMS, as attack frequency declines and there is clear worsening between attacks. In practical terms, the diagnosis of SPMS is typically only made in people with a minimum amount of disability. Occasional relapses and minor remissions may appear. Less frequently, MS starts as PPMS, which is characterised by a progressive worsening in the absence of attacks, from disease onset. Symptoms may become slightly less severe temporarily.

=== Variants and subgroups ===
Regulators and clinical trials often use additional subgroups based on how active the disease is, even if there is no firm agreement on their definition. Examples are 'active MS', 'highly active MS' and 'rapidly evolving severe MS'. One definition of highly active MS is having an unchanged or increased number of relapses even after starting disease-modifying treatment. In addition, the term 'relapsing MS' is often used to denote people with relapsing-remitting MS as well as the subset of individuals with secondary progressive MS who still experience some relapses.

The terms "benign MS" is sometimes used for people who have had MS for a long time (15 years or so) with few attacks and little disability. As people may still get worse, the term is discouraged. On the other hand, the term aggressive multiple sclerosis (previously known as "malignant multiple sclerosis") is used to describe people with MS having reached a significant level of disability in a short period.

Atypical variants of MS have been described; these include tumefactive multiple sclerosis, Balo concentric sclerosis, and Marburg multiple sclerosis.

== Treatment ==
Although no cure for multiple sclerosis has been found, several therapies have proven helpful. Several effective treatments can decrease the number of attacks and the rate of progression. The primary aims of therapy are returning function after an attack, preventing new attacks, and preventing disability. Starting medications is generally recommended in people after the first attack when more than two lesions are seen on MRI.

The first approved medications used to treat MS were modestly effective, though were poorly tolerated and had many adverse effects. Several treatment options with better safety and tolerability profiles have been introduced, improving the prognosis of MS.

=== Acute flares ===
During moderate or severe symptomatic attacks, a short course (usually 3–5 days) of high doses of corticosteroids is the usual approach. Initially, oral corticosteroids are used; if that is ineffective, an intravenous course can be tried. Milder attacks may not need treatment. Although targeted at acute attacks, they might also have a small longer-term benefit. Severe attacks that do not respond to corticosteroids might be treatable by plasma exchange.

=== Disease-modifying treatment ===
==== Relapsing MS ====
Many disease-modifying therapies (DMTs) have been approved for RRMS; and some are highly effective at decreasing the number of attacks. Highly effective medications include monoclonal antibodies directed at CD20-expressing B cells (administered by injection or infusion, e.g. rituximab or ocrelizumab), natalizumab (an integrin inhibitor) or alemtuzumab, which depletes white blood cells more broadly. In general, aggressive treatment in the early stages of MS produces the best long-term outcomes.

Due to their efficacy and safety, CD20 monoclonal antibodies are frequently used as the first-line treatment. They are highly effective (99%) at preventing new lesions to form, and at preventing relapses. They do however not fully prevent progression of disability. The drug class is a good option for women who want to become pregnant as prior treatment continues to be effective throughout the pregnancy.

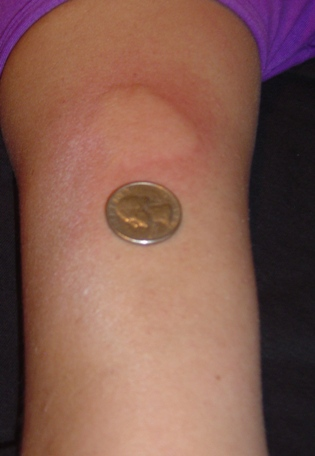
Irritation zone after injection of glatiramer acetate

Most DMTs are associated with an increased rate of infection (such as a UTI or an airway infection), but some, for instance interferons, are safer than others. In addition, S1P modulators can cause brachycardia when treatment is started. The fumerates can cause flushing and bowel issues. Teriflunomide can damage the liver, so monitoring is necessary in the first six months of treatment. Natalizumab can cause a severe infection affecting the nervous system in individuals that test positive for polyomavirus. Alemtuzumab can cause new autoimmune diseases and cancer, which has limited its use.

Treatment of clinically isolated syndrome with interferons, teriflunomide or vitamin D3 can decrease disease activity. For radiologically isolated syndrome (RIS), trials have shown that people are less likely to develop their first relapse when treated with dimethyl fumarate or teriflunomide. The 2024 McDonald criteria reclassify many people with RIS as having early MS, meaning that they may qualify for high-efficacy drugs too.

There is high confidence that natalizumab, cladribine, or alemtuzumab are decreasing relapses over two years for people with RRMS. There is moderate confidence that a two-year treatment with natalizumab slows disability progression for people with RRMS; for all other medications the evidence was weaker. As individuals respond differently to drugs, both in terms of effectiveness and in terms of side effects, it can be necessary to switch treatments.

Medications available for RRMS
Efficacy	Drug class	Example drugs	Sold as	Route of administration
High	CD20 monoclonal antibodies	Ocrelizumab, rituximab, ublituximab	Ocrevus, Rituxan, Briumvi	IV or injection
High	CD52 monoclonal antibodies	Alemtuzumab	Lemtrada	IV
High	Integrin inhibitor	Natalizumab	Tyruko, Tysabri	IV, injection, self-injection
Moderate	Purine analog	Cladribine	Cladribine	Oral
Moderate	S1P modulators	Ponesimod	Ponvory	Oral
Moderate	Pyrimidine synthesis inhibitor	Teriflunomide	Aubagio	Oral
Moderate	Fumarates	Diroximel fumarate	Vumerity	Oral
Lower	Beta interferons	Interferon beta-1a	Avonex	Self-injection
Lower	Glatiramoids	Glatiramer acetate	Copaxone, Brabio	Self-injection

==== Progressive MS ====
For individuals with active secondary progressive MS—e.g. those that still experience relapses—similar drugs can be used as for RRMS. For non-active progressive MS, the options are more limited. In 2026, tolebrutinib, a BTK inhibitor, was approved for non-relapsing secondary MS in the EU. It reduces the activity of microglia, immune cells in the brain, as well as B cells. Earlier, the FDA in the United States decided not to approve the drug. For primary progressive MS, ocrelizumab can be used, which reduces the risk of progression of disability by about 25% each year.

=== Symptom management ===
Alongside treatment that affects the disease course itself, symptom management can improve quality of life for people living with MS. Symptoms that can be treated include sleep issues, pain, fatigue, spasticity (e.g. spasms or stiffness), deconditioning, sexual dysfunction and bladder problems. As people get older and develop other health conditions, effective management of those may improve longer-term MS outcomes.

Spasticity can be treated with muscle relaxants, but in some this can increase problems with balance. Nabiximols (a specific Cannabis extract) likely reduces the severity of spasticity, but may raise risks of psychiatric disorders. Exercise and repetitive transcranial magnetic stimulation may help too, but there have been too few good clinical trials to know for sure.

For mobility problems and fatigue, a supervised exercise program can be beneficial. Individuals who struggle with walking can benefit from taking fampridine. Various drugs can be tried to treat MS-related fatigue, such as amantadine. Fatigue can be managed without drugs too, for instance using cooling devices or with cognitive behavioral therapy.

Bladder problems can be treated with various drugs (e.g. oxybutynin), but also with self catheterization or pelvic floor exercises. For bowel problems, stool softeners or laxatives may help. Non-drug management includes hydration, more physical activity and increased fiber intake. For sexual dysfunction, some drugs can be prescribed, while non-drug options include lubricants and penile prostheses.

=== Alternative treatments ===
Over 50% of people with MS may use complementary and alternative medicine, with dietary supplements most popular, before massage and acupuncture. Users are more frequently women, have had MS for a longer time, have a lower educational attainment and live in semi-rural areas. The evidence for the effectiveness for such treatments in most cases is weak or absent.

Various anti-inflammatory diets (high in fiber and healthy fats, low in refined sugar and processed food) have been tested in MS, such as the Mediterranean diet. Based on limited clinical trial data, they may help slightly reduce fatigue and improve physical health. There are mixed findings about vitamin D supplementation; many meta-analyses find no effects, whereas some do find modest positive impacts on disability progression and relapse rate. There is insufficient evidence supporting high-dose biotin and some evidence for increased disease activity and higher risk of relapse with its use.

Other alternative medicine used in MS include relaxation techniques such as yoga, herbal medicine (including medical cannabis), hyperbaric oxygen therapy, self-infection with hookworms, reflexology, acupuncture, and mindfulness.

== Prognosis ==
The availability of treatments that modify the course of multiple sclerosis beginning in the 1990s, known as disease-modifying therapies (DMTs), has improved prognosis. These treatments can reduce relapses and slow progression, but there is no cure. Before the advent of these medications, it took around 15 years before relapsing-remitting MS progressed to secondary progressive MS (which has associated mobility issues). With these medications, the progression is slower to 40 years.

The prognosis of MS depends on the subtype of the disease, and there is considerable individual variation in the progression of the disease. In relapsing MS, the most common subtype, a 2016 cohort study found that after a median of 16.8 years from onset, one in ten needed a walking aid, and almost two in ten transitioned to secondary progressive MS, a form characterized by more progressive decline. With treatments available in the 2020s, relapses can be eliminated or substantially reduced. However, "silent progression" of the disease still occurs.

In addition to secondary progressive MS (SPMS), a small proportion of people with MS (10–15%) experience progressive decline from the onset, known as primary progressive MS (PPMS). Most treatments have been approved for use in relapsing MS; there are fewer treatments with lower efficacy for progressive forms of MS. The prognosis for progressive MS is worse, with faster accumulation of disability, though with considerable individual variation. In untreated PPMS, the median time from onset to requiring a walking aid is estimated as seven years. In SPMS, a 2014 cohort study reported that people required a walking aid after an average of five years from the onset of SPMS, and were chair or bed-bound after an average of fifteen years.

After diagnosis of MS, characteristics that predict a worse course are male sex, older age, and greater disability at the time of diagnosis; female sex is associated with a higher relapse rate. Spinal cord lesions and a higher number of initial lesions on MRI are predictive of a worse course. Early treatment leads to a better prognosis, but a higher relapse frequency when treated with DMTs is associated with a poorer prognosis. A 60-year longitudinal population study conducted in Norway found that those with MS had a life expectancy seven years shorter than the general population. Median life expectancy for RRMS patients was 77.8 years and 71.4 years for PPMS, compared to 81.8 years for the general population. Life expectancy for men was five years shorter than for women.

== Epidemiology ==
Deaths from multiple sclerosis per million persons in 2012 0 1 2 3–5 6–12 13–25

The total number of people with MS was 3.1 million globally in 2024, with a diagnosed prevalence of 38 per 100,000 people. Moreover, diagnosed prevalence varies widely in different regions around the world. In Africa, there are 4 people per 100,000 diagnosed with MS, compared to South East Asia where the prevalence is 8 per 100,000, 109 per 100,000 in the Americas, and 158 per 100,000 in Europe.

The higher number of cases in countries further from the equator can partially be explained by lower UV radiation and vitamin D production. However, the true difference between countries might be smaller, as richer countries have better resources for MS diagnosis. The prevalence of MS is slowly increasing, which might be explained by countries getting better at diagnosis the disease. In addition, improvements in treatment mean that people with MS live longer.

MS usually appears in adults in their twenties or thirties but it can also start in childhood and in individuals older than 40. Primary progressive MS typically starts after the age of 40. Similarly to many autoimmune disorders, the disease is more common in women, and the gender gap may have grown over time. Globally it is about two to three times more common in women than in men. In children under 12, it is only slightly more common in girls than boys, while in people with primary progressive MS, who are typically older, men and women are roughly equally affected.

== History ==
=== Etymology ===
The name "multiple sclerosis" is short for multiple cerebro-spinal sclerosis, which refers to the numerous glial scars (or sclerae – essentially plaques or lesions) that develop on the white matter of the brain and spinal cord.

=== Medical discovery ===
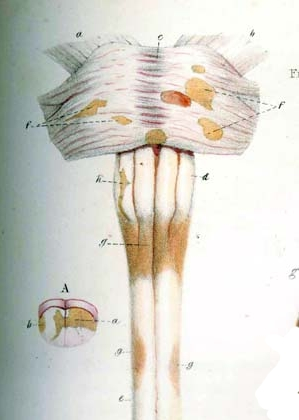
Detail of Carswell's drawing of MS lesions in the brain stem and spinal cord (1838)

Robert Carswell (1793–1857), a British professor of pathology, and Jean Cruveilhier (1791–1873), a French professor of pathologic anatomy, described and illustrated many of the disease's clinical details, but did not identify it as a separate disease. Specifically, Carswell described the injuries he found as "a remarkable lesion of the spinal cord accompanied with atrophy". Under the microscope, Swiss pathologist Georg Eduard Rindfleisch (1836–1908) noted in 1863 that the inflammation-associated lesions were distributed around blood vessels.

The French neurologist Jean-Martin Charcot (1825–1893) was the first person to recognize multiple sclerosis as a distinct disease in 1868. Summarizing previous reports and adding his own clinical and pathological observations, Charcot called the disease sclérose en plaques.

=== Improved diagnosis and treatment ===
The first attempt to establish a set of diagnostic criteria was also due to Charcot in 1868. He published what now is known as the "Charcot triad", consisting of nystagmus, intention tremor, and telegraphic speech (scanning speech). Charcot also observed cognition changes, describing his patients as having a "marked enfeeblement of the memory" and "conceptions that formed slowly".

The diagnosis was based on Charcot triad and clinical observation until Schumacher made the first attempt to standardize criteria in 1965 by introducing some fundamental requirements: Dissemination of the lesions in time (DIT) and space (DIS), and that "signs and symptoms cannot be explained better by another disease process". The DIT and DIS requirement was later inherited by the Poser and McDonald criteria.

During the 20th century, theories about the cause and pathogenesis were developed and effective treatments began to appear in the 1990s. Since the beginning of the 21st century, refinements of the concepts have taken place. The 2010 revision of the McDonald criteria allowed for the diagnosis of MS with only one proved lesion (CIS).

In 1996, the US National Multiple Sclerosis Society (NMSS) (Advisory Committee on Clinical Trials) defined the first version of the clinical phenotypes that is in use. In this first version, they provided standardized definitions for four MS clinical courses: relapsing-remitting (RR), secondary progressive (SP), primary progressive (PP), and progressive relapsing (PR). In 2010, PR was dropped and CIS was incorporated. Three years later, the 2013 revision of the "phenotypes for the disease course" were forced to consider CIS as one of the phenotypes of MS, making obsolete some expressions like "conversion from CIS to MS". Other organizations have proposed later new clinical phenotypes, like HAMS (Highly Active MS).

=== Historical cases ===
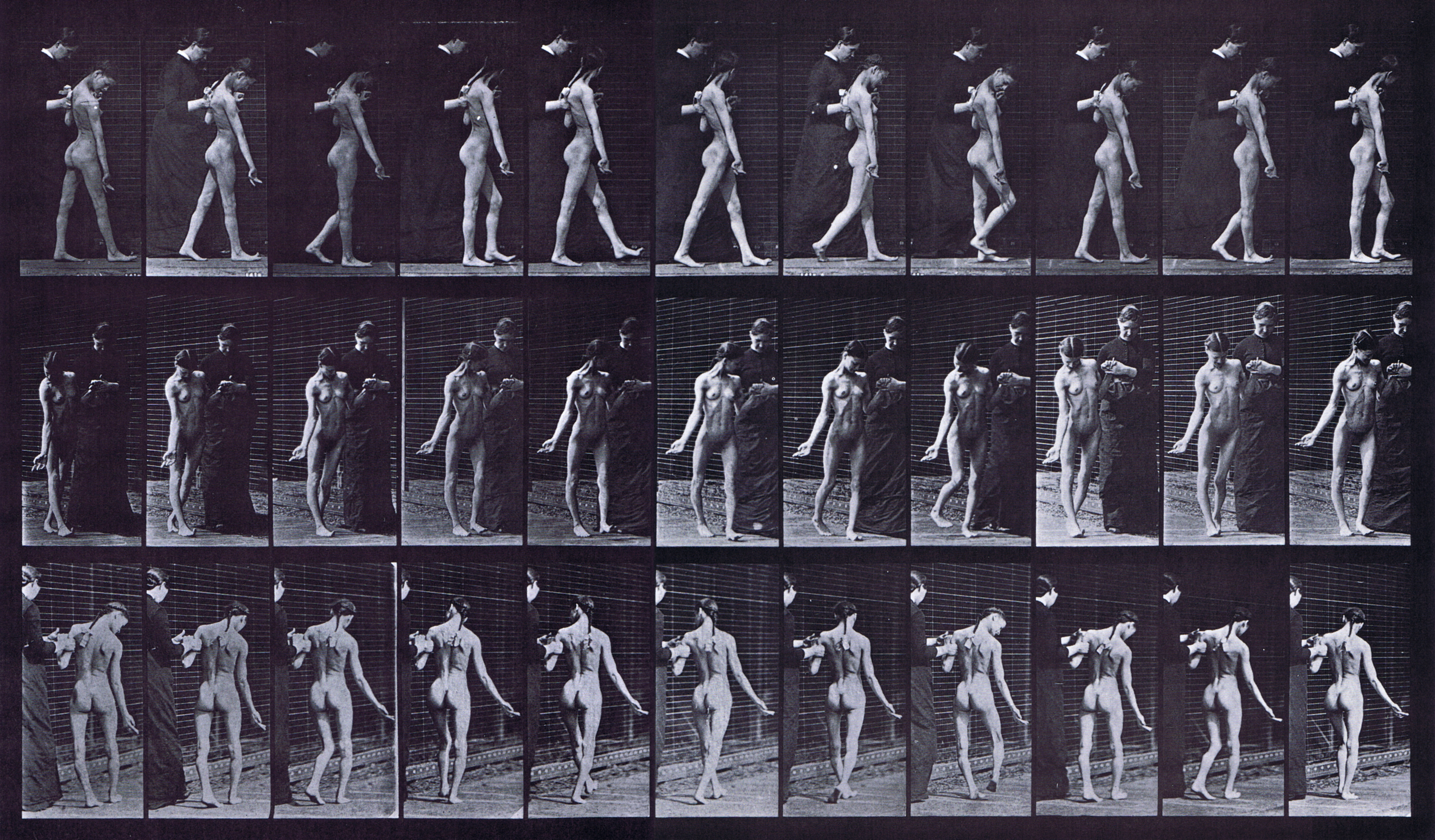
Photographic study of locomotion of a woman with MS with walking difficulties created in 1887 by Muybridge

There are several historical accounts of people who probably had MS and lived before or shortly after the disease was described by Charcot.

A young woman called Halldora who lived in Iceland around 1200 suddenly lost her vision and mobility but recovered them seven days after. Saint Lidwina of Schiedam (1380–1433), a Dutch nun, may be one of the first clearly identifiable people with MS. From the age of 16 until her death at 53, she had intermittent pain, weakness of the legs and vision loss: symptoms typical of MS. Both cases have led to the proposal of a "Viking gene" hypothesis for the dissemination of the disease.

Augustus Frederick d'Este (1794–1848), son of Prince Augustus Frederick, Duke of Sussex and Lady Augusta Murray and a grandson of George III of the United Kingdom, almost certainly had MS. D'Este left a detailed diary describing his 22 years living with the disease. His diary began in 1822 and ended in 1846, although it remained unknown until 1948. His symptoms began at age 28 with a sudden transient visual loss (amaurosis fugax) after the funeral of a friend. During his disease, he developed weakness in the legs, clumsiness of the hands, numbness, dizziness, bladder disturbance and erectile dysfunction. In 1844, he began to use a wheelchair. Despite his illness, he kept an optimistic view of life. Another early account of MS was kept by the British diarist W. N. P. Barbellion, pen name of Bruce Frederick Cummings (1889–1919), who maintained a detailed log of his diagnosis and struggle. His diary was published in 1919 as The Journal of a Disappointed Man. Charles Dickens, a keen observer, described possible bilateral optic neuritis with reduced contrast vision and Uhthoff's phenomenon in the main female character of Bleak House (1852–1853), Esther Summerson.

== Research directions ==
=== Human endogenous retroviruses ===
Two members of the human endogenous retroviruses-W (HERV-W) family, namely, ERVWE1 and MS-associated retrovirus (MSRV), may be co-factors in MS immunopathogenesis. HERVs constitute up to 8% of the human genome; most are epigenetically silent, but can be reactivated by exogenous viruses, proinflammatory conditions or oxidative stress.

=== Biomarkers ===
Researchers are investigating biomarkers to help diagnose MS, to inform prognoses, and track response to medication. Ideally, biomarker would be detectable in blood, as cerebrospinal fluid is more difficult to access. Three biomarkers are emerging as candidates for real-world applications: Neurofilament light chain (NfL), chitinase-3-like protein 1 (CHI3L1) and glial fibrillary acidic protein (GFAP). NfL levels are elevated years before people typically get an MS diagnosis, and is of interest as a potential screening tool. GFAP and CHI3L1 may be able to track progression independent if relapse activity, and be used as disease progress markers.

=== Medications ===
Drugs that might promote remyelination are being studied. These drug may benefit individuals that have had myelin damage, but not yet widespread damage to exposed nerves. In general, these drugs stimulate oligodendrites in some form, which are the cells that produce myelin. Drugs under investigation include metformin (a diabetes drug), clemastine (an anti-histamine) and GSK239512. Metformin is tested in Belgium for individuals with non-active progressive MS, and Canada, for MS patients up to 25 years old. A separate trial in the UK investigates it in combination with clemastine for the treatment of relapsing-remitting MS.

One reason it has been challenging to find drugs for progressive MS is the intact blood–brain barrier, which makes it difficult to deliver drugs to the nervous system. During attacks in relapsing MS, the barrier is weakened. BTK inhibitors can cross this barrier to varying degrees, and many are studied for different types of MS. Therapies against EBV are of interest too. An EBV vaccine might help against MS, but there is also a risk the vaccine itself might trigger or worsen MS. Finally, CAR-T therapy is studied as a way to reset the immune system.

=== Other emerging theories ===
One emerging hypothesis, referred to as the hygiene hypothesis, suggests that early-life exposure to infectious agents helps to develop the immune system and reduces susceptibility to allergies and autoimmune disorders. The hygiene hypothesis has been linked with MS and microbiome hypotheses.

In 2024, scientists shared research on their findings of ancient migration to northern Europe from the Yamnaya area of culture, tracing MS-risk gene variants dating back around 5,000 years. The MS-risk gene variants protected ancient cattle herders from animal diseases, but modern lifestyles, diets and better hygiene, have allowed the gene to develop, resulting in the higher risk of MS today.

== See also ==
- List of multiple sclerosis organizations
- List of people with multiple sclerosis
