= Chromosome 13 =

Human chromosome

- Human chromosome 13 pair after G-banding. One is from mother, one is from father.

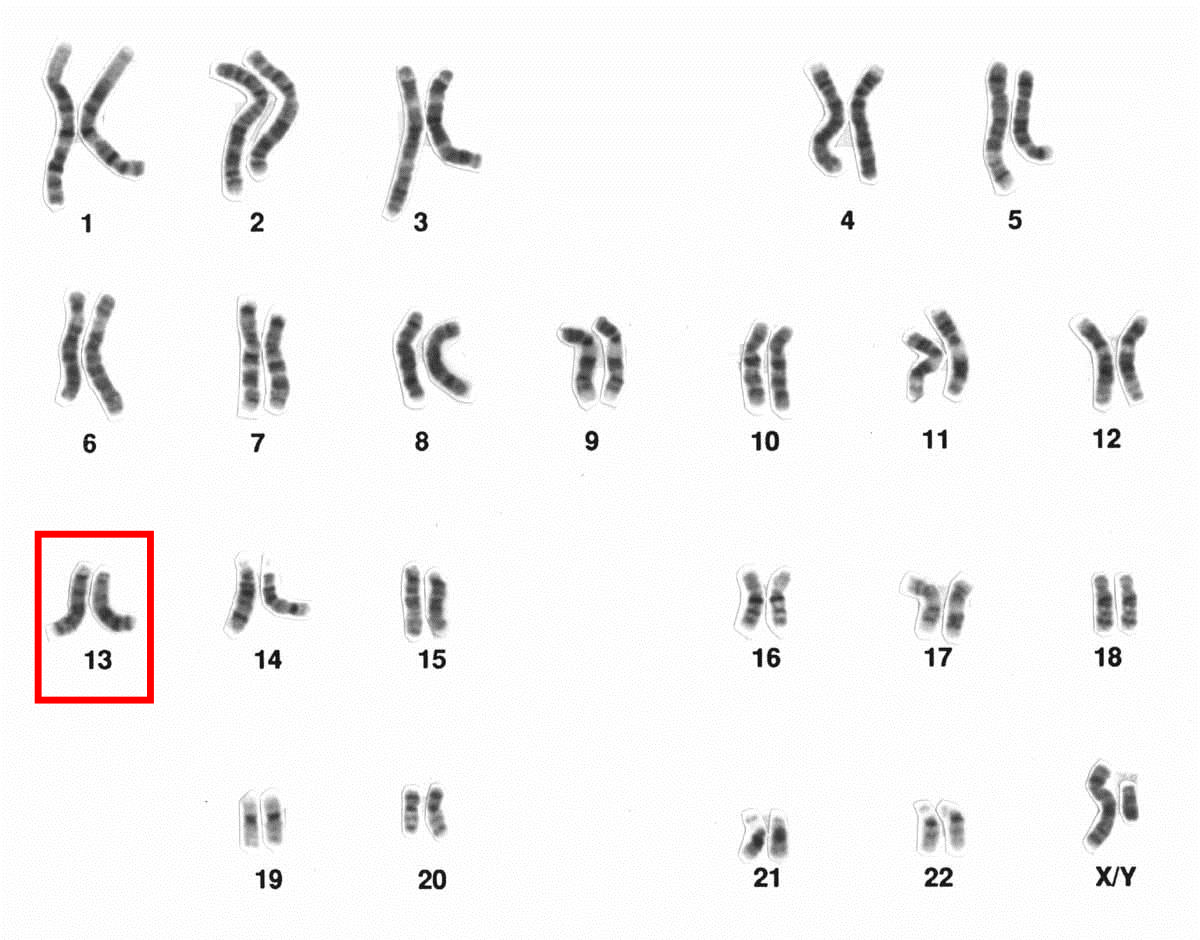
- Chromosome 13 pair in human male karyogram.

Features
- Length (bp): 113,566,686 bp (CHM13)
- No. of genes: 308 (CCDS)
- Type: Autosome
- Centromere position: Acrocentric (17.7 Mbp)

Complete gene lists
- CCDS: Gene list
- HGNC: Gene list
- UniProt: Gene list
- NCBI: Gene list

External map viewers
- Ensembl: Chromosome 13
- Entrez: Chromosome 13
- NCBI: Chromosome 13
- UCSC: Chromosome 13

Full DNA sequences
- RefSeq: NC_000013 (FASTA)
- GenBank: CM000675 (FASTA)

Chromosome 13 is one of the 23 pairs of chromosomes in humans. People normally have two copies of this chromosome. Chromosome 13 spans about 113 million base pairs (the building material of DNA) and represents between 3.5 and 4% of the total DNA in cells.

== Genes ==
=== Number of genes ===
The following are some of the gene count estimates of human chromosome 13. Because researchers use different approaches to genome annotation their predictions of the number of genes on each chromosome varies (for technical details, see gene prediction). Among various projects, the collaborative consensus coding sequence project (CCDS) takes an extremely conservative strategy. So CCDS's gene number prediction represents a lower bound on the total number of human protein-coding genes.

Estimated by	Protein-coding genes	Non-coding RNA genes	Pseudogenes	Source	Release date
CCDS	308	—	—		2016-09-08
HGNC	309	323	469		2017-05-12
Ensembl	324	586	373		2017-03-29
UniProt	329	—	—		2018-02-28
NCBI	343	622	481		2017-05-19

=== Gene list ===
The following is a partial list of genes on human chromosome 13. For complete list, see the link in the infobox on the right.

- ARGLU1: encoding protein Arginine and glutamate-rich protein 1
- ATP7B: ATPase, Cu++ transporting, beta polypeptide (Wilson disease)
- BRCA2: breast cancer 2, early onset
- BRCA3 encoding protein Breast cancer 3
- C13orf42: encoding protein C13orf42
- CAB39L: encoding protein Calcium-binding protein 39-like
- CARKD: Carbohydrate Kinase Domain Containing Protein (Unknown Function)
- CCDC70: Coiled-coil domain-containing protein 70
- CHAMP1: Chromosome alignment-maintaining phosphoprotein 1
- CKAP2: Cytoskeleton-associated protein 2
- CLYBL: Citrate lyase beta like
- CPB2-AS1: encoding protein Cpb2 antisense rna 1
- CRYL1: encoding protein Crystallin, lambda 1
- DLEU1: a long non-coding RNA
- DLEU2: Deleted in lymphocytic leukemia 1
- DZIP1: DAZ interacting zinc finger protein 1
- EDNRB: endothelin receptor type B
- ELF1: encoding protein E74-like factor 1 (ets domain transcription factor)
- EPSTI1: encoding protein Epithelial stromal interaction 1
- ESD: S-formylglutathione hydrolase
- FAM155A: encoding protein Family with sequence similarity 155, member A
- FLT1: Fms related tyrosine kinase 1 (Vascular endothelial growth factor receptor 1)
- GJB2: gap junction protein, beta 2, 26kDa (connexin 26)
- GJB6: gap junction protein, beta 6 (connexin 30)
- Glypican 5: encoding protein Glypican-5
- HTR2A: 5-HT_{2A} receptor
- INTS6: encoding protein Integrator complex subunit 6
- ITGBL1: encoding protein Integrin subunit beta like 1
- GPALPP1: encoding protein KIAA1704
- L1TD1P1: encoding protein LINE-1 type transposase domain containing 1 pseudogene 1
- LACC1: encoding protein Laccase (multicopper oxidoreductase) domain containing 1
- LHFP: encoding protein Lipoma HMGIC fusion partner
- LINC00327: Long intergenic non-protein coding RNA 327
- LINC00346: Long intergenic non-protein coding RNA 346
- LINC00598: Long intergenic non-protein coding RNA 598
- LOC107984557 encoding protein Methylcytosine dioxygenase TET1-like
- MBNL2: encoding protein Muscleblind-like protein 2
- MIPEP: encoding enzyme Mitochondrial intermediate peptidase
- MIRH1: encoding protein Putative microRNA host gene 1 protein
- MTRF1:
- MTUS2: encoding protein Microtubule associated scaffold protein 2
- NDFIP2: encoding protein NEDD4 family-interacting protein 2
- NUPL1: encoding protein Nucleoporin p58/p45
- OLFM4: encoding protein Olfactomedin 4
- POMP: encoding proteasome maturation protein
- PCCA: propionyl Coenzyme A carboxylase, alpha polypeptide
- RB1: retinoblastoma 1 (including osteosarcoma)
- RCBTB1: encoding protein RCC1 and BTB domain-containing protein 1
- RCBTB2: encoding protein RCC1 and BTB domain-containing protein 2
- RGCC: encoding protein Regulator of cell cycle RGCC
- RNA28S1: encoding protein RNA, 28S ribosomal 1
- RNR1: encoding RNA, ribosomal 45S cluster 1
- SCEL: encoding protein Sciellin
- SLC46A3: encoding protein Solute carrier family 46, member 3
- SLITRK1: encoding protein SLIT and NTRK-like protein 1
- SLITRK1: mutation in this gene causes some (although very few) cases of Tourette syndrome and trichotillomania
- SLITRK5: encoding protein SLIT and NTRK-like protein 5
- SLITRK6: encoding protein SLIT and NTRK-like protein 6
- SOX21: Transcription factor SOX-21 is a protein that in humans is encoded by the SOX21; its disruption can lead to types of alopecia in mice.
- SPRYD7: encoding protein SPRY domain-containing protein 7
- SUPT20H: SPT20 homolog
- TDRD3: encoding protein Tudor domain-containing protein 3
- TM9SF2: encoding protein Transmembrane 9 superfamily member 2
- TPT1: Translationally controlled tumor protein (TCTP)
- TSC22D1: encoding protein TSC22 domain family protein 1
- UBL3: encoding protein Ubiquitin-like protein 3
- WBP4: encoding protein WW domain-binding protein 4
- XPO4: encoding protein Exportin-4
- ZC3H13: encoding protein Zinc finger CCCH domain-containing protein 13
- ZMYM2: encoding protein Zinc finger MYM-type protein 2

== Diseases and disorders ==
The following diseases and disorders are some of those related to genes on chromosome 13:

- 13q deletion syndrome
- Bipolar disorder
- Bladder cancer
- Breast cancer
- Heterochromia
- Hirschsprung's disease
- Maturity onset diabetes of the young type 4
- Nonsyndromic deafness
- Propionic acidemia
- Retinoblastoma
- Schizophrenia
- Waardenburg syndrome
- Wilson's disease
- Patau syndrome
- Chronic lymphocytic leukemia (Acquired defect)
- Young–Madders syndrome

== Chromosomal conditions ==
The following conditions are caused by changes in the structure or number of copies of chromosome 13:

- Retinoblastoma: A small percentage of retinoblastoma cases are caused by deletions in the region of chromosome 13 (13q14) containing the RB1 gene. Children with these chromosomal deletions may also have intellectual disability, slow growth, and characteristic facial features (such as prominent eyebrows, a broad nasal bridge, a short nose, and ear abnormalities). Researchers have not determined which other genes are located in the deleted region, but a loss of several genes is likely responsible for these developmental problems.
- Trisomy 13: Trisomy 13 occurs when each cell in the body has three copies of chromosome 13 instead of the usual two copies. Trisomy 13 can also result from an extra copy of chromosome 13 in only some of the body's cells (mosaic trisomy 13). In a small percentage of cases, trisomy 13 is caused by a rearrangement of chromosomal material between chromosome 13 and another chromosome. As a result, a person has the two usual copies of chromosome 13, plus extra material from chromosome 13 attached to another chromosome. These cases are called translocation trisomy 13. Extra material from chromosome 13 disrupts the course of normal development, causing the characteristic signs and symptoms of trisomy 13. Researchers are not yet certain how this extra genetic material leads to the features of the disorder, which include severely abnormal cerebral functions, a small cranium, retardation, non functional eyes and heart defects.
- Other chromosomal conditions: Partial monosomy 13q is a rare chromosomal disorder that results when a piece of the long arm (q) of chromosome 13 is missing (monosomic). Infants born with partial monosomy 13q may exhibit low birth weight, malformations of the head and face (craniofacial region), skeletal abnormalities (especially of the hands and feet), and other physical abnormalities. Intellectual disability is characteristic of this condition. The mortality rate during infancy is high among individuals born with this disorder. Almost all cases of partial monosomy 13q occur randomly for no apparent reason (sporadic).

== Cytogenetic band ==
G-banding ideograms of human chromosome 13

G-banding ideogram of human chromosome 13 in resolution 850 bphs. Band length in this diagram is proportional to base-pair length. This type of ideogram is generally used in genome browsers (e.g. Ensembl, UCSC Genome Browser).

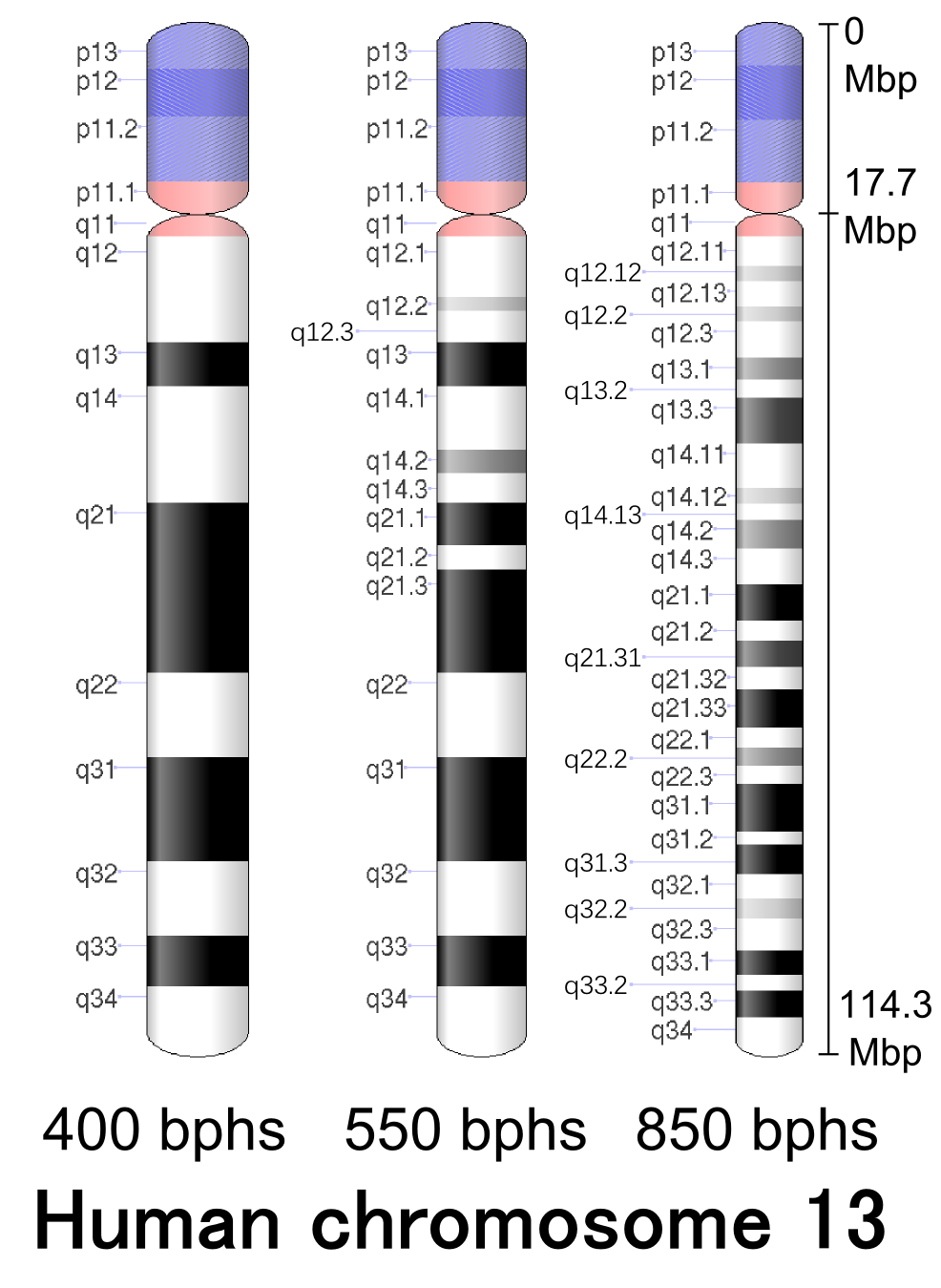
G-banding patterns of human chromosome 13 in three different resolutions (400, 550 and 850). Band length in this diagram is based on the ideograms from ISCN (2013). This type of ideogram represents actual relative band length observed under a microscope at the different moments during the mitotic process.

G-bands of human chromosome 13 in resolution 850 bphs
Chr.	Arm	Band	ISCN start	ISCN stop	Basepair start	Basepair stop	Stain	Density
13	p	13	0	282	1	4,600,000	gvar	
13	p	12	282	620	4,600,001	10,100,000	stalk	
13	p	11.2	620	1015	10,100,001	16,500,000	gvar	
13	p	11.1	1015	1198	16,500,001	17,700,000	acen	
13	q	11	1198	1353	17,700,001	18,900,000	acen	
13	q	12.11	1353	1536	18,900,001	22,600,000	gneg	
13	q	12.12	1536	1635	22,600,001	24,900,000	gpos	25
13	q	12.13	1635	1790	24,900,001	27,200,000	gneg	
13	q	12.2	1790	1888	27,200,001	28,300,000	gpos	25
13	q	12.3	1888	2114	28,300,001	31,600,000	gneg	
13	q	13.1	2114	2255	31,600,001	33,400,000	gpos	50
13	q	13.2	2255	2367	33,400,001	34,900,000	gneg	
13	q	13.3	2367	2649	34,900,001	39,500,000	gpos	75
13	q	14.11	2649	2931	39,500,001	44,600,000	gneg	
13	q	14.12	2931	3030	44,600,001	45,200,000	gpos	25
13	q	14.13	3030	3128	45,200,001	46,700,000	gneg	
13	q	14.2	3128	3311	46,700,001	50,300,000	gpos	50
13	q	14.3	3311	3537	50,300,001	54,700,000	gneg	
13	q	21.1	3537	3762	54,700,001	59,000,000	gpos	100
13	q	21.2	3762	3889	59,000,001	61,800,000	gneg	
13	q	21.31	3889	4058	61,800,001	65,200,000	gpos	75
13	q	21.32	4058	4199	65,200,001	68,100,000	gneg	
13	q	21.33	4199	4439	68,100,001	72,800,000	gpos	100
13	q	22.1	4439	4565	72,800,001	74,900,000	gneg	
13	q	22.2	4565	4678	74,900,001	76,700,000	gpos	50
13	q	22.3	4678	4791	76,700,001	78,500,000	gneg	
13	q	31.1	4791	5087	78,500,001	87,100,000	gpos	100
13	q	31.2	5087	5171	87,100,001	89,400,000	gneg	
13	q	31.3	5171	5355	89,400,001	94,400,000	gpos	100
13	q	32.1	5355	5510	94,400,001	97,500,000	gneg	
13	q	32.2	5510	5636	97,500,001	98,700,000	gpos	25
13	q	32.3	5636	5834	98,700,001	101,100,000	gneg	
13	q	33.1	5834	5989	101,100,001	104,200,000	gpos	100
13	q	33.2	5989	6087	104,200,001	106,400,000	gneg	
13	q	33.3	6087	6256	106,400,001	109,600,000	gpos	100
13	q	34	6256	6510	109,600,001	114,364,328	gneg	
