= MAB21L1 =

Protein-coding gene in the species Homo sapiens

Identifiers
- Aliases: MAB21L1, CAGR1, Nbla00126, mab-21 like 1, COFG
- External IDs: OMIM: 601280; MGI: 1333773; GeneCards: MAB21L1
Available structures
PDB	Ortholog search: PDBe RCSB
PDB	List of PDB id codes 5EOG, 5EOM

Gene location (Human)
Chr.	Chromosome 13 (human)
Band	13q13.3	Start	35,473,789 bp
Band	13q13.3	End	35,476,689 bp

Gene location (Mouse)
Chr.	Chromosome 3 (mouse)
Band	3|3 C	Start	55,689,931 bp
Band	3|3 C	End	55,692,422 bp
RNA expression pattern
Bgee	Human / Mouse (ortholog); Top expressed in: retinal pigment epithelium; cerebellar vermis; paraflocculus of cerebellum; right hemisphere of cerebellum; urethra; secondary oocyte; Achilles tendon; nipple; lactiferous gland; human penis / Top expressed in: epithelium of lens; neural layer of retina; ciliary body; retinal pigment epithelium; iris; pineal gland; maxillary prominence; lobe of cerebellum; mandibular prominence; cerebellar vermis; More reference expression data
BioGPS	n/a
Gene ontology
Molecular function	protein binding; nucleotide binding; ATP binding; GTP binding; transferase activity; nucleotidyltransferase activity; metal ion binding
Cellular component	nucleus
Biological process	multicellular organism development; anatomical structure morphogenesis; camera-type eye development; positive regulation of cell population proliferation
Sources:Amigo / QuickGO
Orthologs
Databases	NCBI: entry; OMA: entry
Species	Human	Mouse
Entrez	4081	17116
Ensembl	ENSG00000180660	ENSMUSG00000056947
UniProt	Q13394	O70299
RefSeq (mRNA)	NM_005584	NM_010750
RefSeq (protein)	NP_005575	NP_034880
Location (UCSC)	Chr 13: 35.47 – 35.48 Mb	Chr 3: 55.69 – 55.69 Mb
PubMed search
- Wikidata
View/Edit Human	View/Edit Mouse

Mab-21 like 1 is a protein that in humans is encoded by the MAB21L1 gene.

== Function ==
This gene is similar to the MAB-21 cell fate-determining gene found in C. elegans. It may be involved in eye and cerebellum development, and it has been proposed that expansion of a trinucleotide repeat region in the 5' UTR may play a role in a variety of psychiatric disorders. [provided by RefSeq, Oct 2008].
