= SCEL =

SCEL may refer to:

- Arturo Merino Benítez International Airport, ICAO airport code SCEL
- SCEL (gene)
- South Carolina Education Lottery
- Southern Counties East Football League
