= ZC3H13 =

Protein-coding gene in the species Homo sapiens

Identifiers
- Aliases: ZC3H13, KIAA0853, zinc finger CCCH-type containing 13, Xio
- External IDs: OMIM: 616453; MGI: 1914552; GeneCards: ZC3H13

Gene location (Human)
Chr.	Chromosome 13 (human)
Band	13q14.13	Start	45,954,465 bp
Band	13q14.13	End	46,052,759 bp

Gene location (Mouse)
Chr.	Chromosome 14 (mouse)
Band	14|14 D3	Start	75,521,813 bp
Band	14|14 D3	End	75,581,866 bp
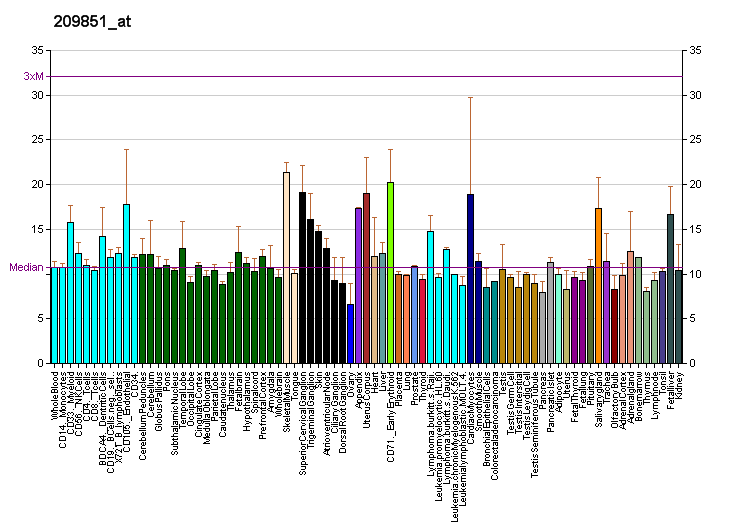

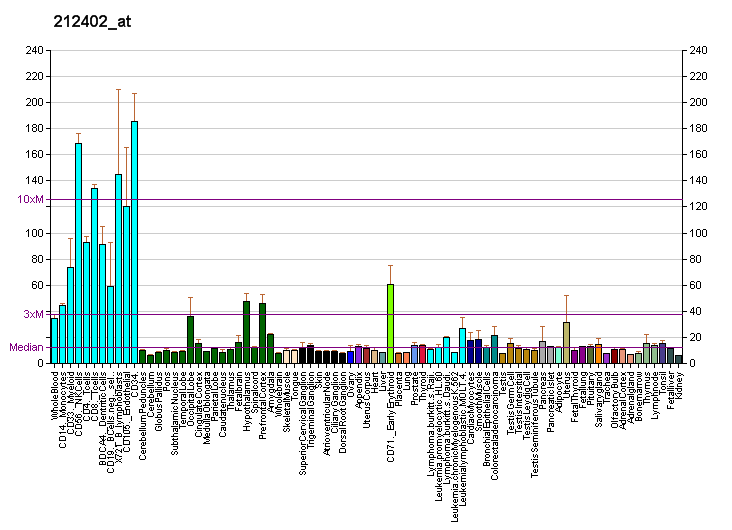
RNA expression pattern
Bgee	Human / Mouse (ortholog); Top expressed in: sural nerve; Achilles tendon; secondary oocyte; tibia; corpus callosum; testicle; optic nerve; tail of epididymis; right lobe of liver; subthalamic nucleus / Top expressed in: Rostral migratory stream; otic vesicle; zygote; oocyte; primary oocyte; secondary oocyte; tail of embryo; ventricular zone; genital tubercle; hand; More reference expression data
BioGPS	More reference expression data
Gene ontology
Molecular function	protein binding; metal ion binding; RNA binding
Cellular component	nuclear speck; nucleus; nucleoplasm; RNA N6-methyladenosine methyltransferase complex
Biological process	mRNA processing; multicellular organism development; RNA splicing; mRNA methylation; regulation of stem cell population maintenance
Sources:Amigo / QuickGO
Orthologs
Databases	NCBI: entry; OMA: entry
Species	Human	Mouse
Entrez	23091	67302
Ensembl	ENSG00000123200	ENSMUSG00000022000
UniProt	Q5T200	E9Q784
RefSeq (mRNA)	NM_015070; NM_001076788; NM_001330564; NM_001330565; NM_001330566 NM_001330567; NM_001382206; NM_001382207; NM_001382208; NM_001382209; NM_001382210; NM_001382211; NM_001382212; NM_001382213; NM_001382214	NM_026083; NM_027377; NM_001359875
RefSeq (protein)	NP_001070256; NP_001317493; NP_001317494; NP_001317495; NP_001317496 NP_055885; NP_001369135; NP_001369136; NP_001369137; NP_001369138; NP_001369139; NP_001369140; NP_001369141; NP_001369142; NP_001369143	NP_080359; NP_001346804
Location (UCSC)	Chr 13: 45.95 – 46.05 Mb	Chr 14: 75.52 – 75.58 Mb
PubMed search
- Wikidata
View/Edit Human	View/Edit Mouse

Zinc finger CCCH domain-containing protein 13 is a protein that in humans is encoded by the ZC3H13 gene.
