= Mitochondrial translational release factor 1 =

Protein-coding gene in the species Homo sapiens

MTRF1

Identifiers
- Aliases: MTRF1, MRF1, MTTRF1, RF1, mitochondrial translational release factor 1, mitochondrial translation release factor 1
- External IDs: OMIM: 604601; MGI: 2384815; GeneCards: MTRF1

Gene location (Human)
Chr.	Chromosome 13 (human)
Band	13q14.11	Start	41,216,369 bp
Band	13q14.11	End	41,263,577 bp

Gene location (Mouse)
Chr.	Chromosome 14 (mouse)
Band	14|14 D3	Start	79,635,212 bp
Band	14|14 D3	End	79,661,027 bp
RNA expression pattern
Bgee	Human / Mouse (ortholog); Top expressed in: body of pancreas; rectum; right adrenal gland; right adrenal cortex; gallbladder; left adrenal gland; granulocyte; testicle; left adrenal cortex; body of stomach / Top expressed in: left ventricle; interventricular septum; quadriceps femoris muscle; primary oocyte; muscle tissue; proximal tubule; muscle of thigh; skeletal muscle tissue; right kidney; ovary; More reference expression data
BioGPS	n/a
Gene ontology
Molecular function	translation release factor activity; translation release factor activity, codon specific; ribosome binding
Cellular component	mitochondrion; cytoplasm
Biological process	translational termination; regulation of translational termination; protein biosynthesis; mitochondrial translational termination
Sources:Amigo / QuickGO
Orthologs
Databases	NCBI: entry; OMA: entry
Species	Human	Mouse
Entrez	9617	211253
Ensembl	ENSG00000120662	ENSMUSG00000022022
UniProt	O75570; Q8N6Z2	Q8K126
RefSeq (mRNA)	NM_004294; NM_001354073; NM_001354074; NM_001354076	NM_145960
RefSeq (protein)	NP_004285; NP_001341002; NP_001341003; NP_001341005	NP_666072
Location (UCSC)	Chr 13: 41.22 – 41.26 Mb	Chr 14: 79.64 – 79.66 Mb
PubMed search
- Wikidata
View/Edit Human	View/Edit Mouse

Mitochondrial translational release factor 1, also known as MTRF1, is a human gene.

The protein encoded by this gene directs the termination of translation in response to the peptide chain termination codons. Initially thought to have a role in the termination of mitochondria protein synthesis. mtRF1 has been hypothesized to recognize non-standard stop codons AGA and AGG in vertebrates. Alternatively, based on detailed 3D modelling, it has been proposed to recognize stalled ribosomes in which a tRNA is still bound to the peptide chain, but in which the A-site of the ribosome is empty.
