= Epithelial stromal interaction 1 =

Protein-coding gene in the species Homo sapiens

EPSTI1

Identifiers
- Aliases: EPSTI1, BRESI1, epithelial stromal interaction 1 (breast), epithelial stromal interaction 1
- External IDs: OMIM: 607441; MGI: 1915168; HomoloGene: 12630; GeneCards: EPSTI1; OMA:EPSTI1 - orthologs

Gene location (Human)
Chr.	Chromosome 13 (human)
Band	13q14.11	Start	42,886,388 bp
Band	13q14.11	End	42,992,271 bp

Gene location (Mouse)
Chr.	Chromosome 14 (mouse)
Band	14|14 D3	Start	78,141,679 bp
Band	14|14 D3	End	78,240,097 bp
RNA expression pattern
Bgee	Human / Mouse (ortholog); Top expressed in: oocyte; secondary oocyte; mucosa of ileum; monocyte; decidua; granulocyte; appendix; pancreatic epithelial cell; jejunal mucosa; palpebral conjunctiva / Top expressed in: mesenteric lymph nodes; zygote; secondary oocyte; spleen; thymus; granulocyte; ileum; primary oocyte; duodenum; jejunum; More reference expression data
BioGPS	n/a
Orthologs
Species	Human	Mouse
Entrez	94240	108670
Ensembl	ENSG00000133106	ENSMUSG00000022014
UniProt	Q96J88	Q8VDI1
RefSeq (mRNA)	NM_001002264; NM_033255; NM_001330543; NM_001331228	NM_029495; NM_178825
RefSeq (protein)	NP_001002264; NP_001317472; NP_001318157; NP_150280	NP_083771; NP_849147
Location (UCSC)	Chr 13: 42.89 – 42.99 Mb	Chr 14: 78.14 – 78.24 Mb
PubMed search
- Wikidata
View/Edit Human	View/Edit Mouse

Epithelial stromal interaction 1 is a protein that in humans is encoded by the EPSTI1 gene.

== Function ==
The protein encoded by this gene has been shown to promote tumor invasion and metastasis in some invasive cancer cells when overexpressed. Expression of this gene has been shown to be upregulated by direct binding of the Kruppel like factor 8 protein to promoter sequences. The translated protein interacts with the amino terminal region of the valosin containing protein gene product, resulting in the nuclear translocation of the nuclear factor kappa B subunit 1 gene product, and activation of target genes. Overexpression of this gene has been observed in some breast cancers and in some individuals with systemic lupus erythematosus (SLE).
