= TSC22D1 =

Protein-coding gene in the species Homo sapiens

Identifiers
- Aliases: TSC22D1, Ptg-2, TGFB1I4, TSC22, TSC22 domain family member 1
- External IDs: OMIM: 607715; MGI: 109127; GeneCards: TSC22D1

Gene location (Human)
Chr.	Chromosome 13 (human)
Band	13q14.11	Start	44,432,143 bp
Band	13q14.11	End	44,577,147 bp

Gene location (Mouse)
Chr.	Chromosome 14 (mouse)
Band	14 D3|14 40.44 cM	Start	76,652,401 bp
Band	14 D3|14 40.44 cM	End	76,745,205 bp
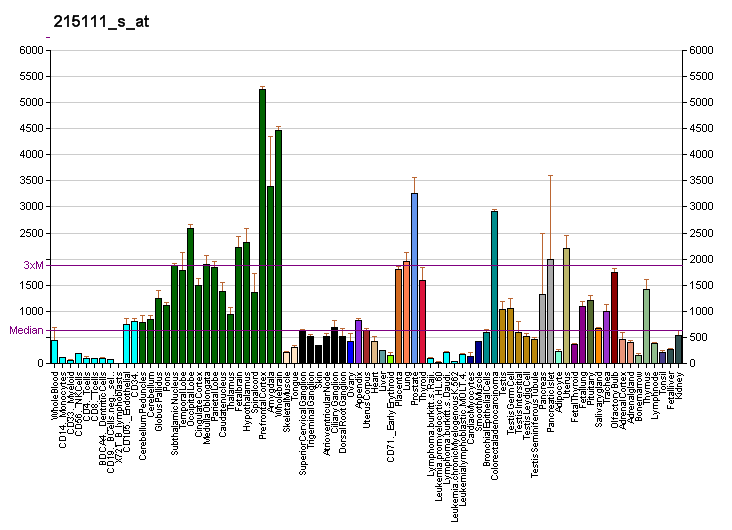
RNA expression pattern
Bgee	Human / Mouse (ortholog); Top expressed in: endothelial cell; Brodmann area 23; middle temporal gyrus; tibia; dorsal motor nucleus of vagus nerve; postcentral gyrus; beta cell; entorhinal cortex; mucosa of paranasal sinus; caput epididymis / Top expressed in: iris; medullary collecting duct; renal corpuscle; vestibular sensory epithelium; epithelium of lens; Epithelium of choroid plexus; ciliary body; condyle; fossa; vas deferens; More reference expression data
BioGPS	More reference expression data
Gene ontology
Molecular function	protein binding; DNA-binding transcription factor activity; DNA-binding transcription factor activity, RNA polymerase II-specific
Cellular component	cytoplasm; nucleus
Biological process	regulation of transcription, DNA-templated; transcription by RNA polymerase II; transcription, DNA-templated; regulation of transcription by RNA polymerase II
Sources:Amigo / QuickGO
Orthologs
Databases	NCBI: entry; OMA: entry
Species	Human	Mouse
Entrez	8848	21807
Ensembl	ENSG00000102804	ENSMUSG00000022010
UniProt	Q15714	P62500
RefSeq (mRNA)	NM_001243797; NM_001243798; NM_001243799; NM_006022; NM_183422	NM_001177751; NM_009366; NM_207652; NM_001310646; NM_001310647
RefSeq (protein)	NP_001230726; NP_001230727; NP_001230728; NP_006013; NP_904358	NP_001171222; NP_001297575; NP_001297576; NP_033392; NP_997535
Location (UCSC)	Chr 13: 44.43 – 44.58 Mb	Chr 14: 76.65 – 76.75 Mb
PubMed search
- Wikidata
View/Edit Human	View/Edit Mouse

TSC22 domain family protein 1 is a protein that in humans is encoded by the TSC22D1 gene.

TSC22 encodes a transcription factor and belongs to the large family of early response genes.

TSC22D1 forms homodimers via its conserved leucine zipper domain and heterodimerizes with TSC22D4. TSC22D1 has transcriptional repressor activity.
