= MIPEP =

Protein-coding gene in the species Homo sapiens

Identifiers
- Aliases: MIPEP, HMIP, MIP, mitochondrial intermediate peptidase, COXPD31
- External IDs: OMIM: 602241; MGI: 1917728; GeneCards: MIPEP
Enzyme activity
EC #	BRENDA	ExPASy	KEGG	MetaCyc
3.4.24.59	↗	↗	↗	↗

Gene location (Human)
Chr.	Chromosome 13 (human)
Band	13q12.12	Start	23,730,189 bp
Band	13q12.12	End	23,889,400 bp

Gene location (Mouse)
Chr.	Chromosome 14 (mouse)
Band	14|14 D1	Start	61,022,022 bp
Band	14|14 D1	End	61,142,927 bp
RNA expression pattern
Bgee	Human / Mouse (ortholog); Top expressed in: right auricle of heart; apex of heart; gonad; left ventricle; right uterine tube; skin of abdomen; skin of leg; bronchial epithelial cell; olfactory zone of nasal mucosa; mucosa of transverse colon / Top expressed in: seminiferous tubule; spermatid; interventricular septum; myocardium of ventricle; otolith organ; utricle; oocyte; primary oocyte; spermatocyte; secondary oocyte; More reference expression data
BioGPS	n/a
Gene ontology
Molecular function	peptidase activity; hydrolase activity; metallopeptidase activity; metal ion binding; metalloendopeptidase activity
Cellular component	mitochondrial matrix; mitochondrion
Biological process	peptide metabolic process; proteolysis; protein processing involved in protein targeting to mitochondrion
Sources:Amigo / QuickGO
Orthologs
Databases	NCBI: entry; OMA: entry
Species	Human	Mouse
Entrez	4285	70478
Ensembl	ENSG00000027001	ENSMUSG00000021993
UniProt	Q99797	A6H611
RefSeq (mRNA)	NM_005932	NM_027436
RefSeq (protein)	NP_005923	NP_081712
Location (UCSC)	Chr 13: 23.73 – 23.89 Mb	Chr 14: 61.02 – 61.14 Mb
PubMed search
- Wikidata
View/Edit Human	View/Edit Mouse

Mitochondrial intermediate peptidase is an enzyme that in humans is encoded by the MIPEP gene. This protein is a critical component of human mitochondrial protein import machinery involved in the maturing process of nuclear coded mitochondrial proteins that with a mitochondrial translocation peptide, especially those OXPHOS-related proteins.

== Structure ==
=== Gene ===
The gene MIPEP encodes one metalloprotease that hydrolyzes peptide fragment of eight amino acids in lengths to process mitochondria-targeted proteins. The human gene MIPEP has 21 Exons and locates at chromosome band13q12. Evidences showed that the human gene MIPEP is highly expressed in the heart, skeletal muscle, and pancreas, three organ systems that are frequently reported with OXPHOS disorders.

=== Protein ===
The human protein Mitochondrial intermediate peptidase is 80.6 kDa in size and composed of 713 amino acids. It contains a mitonchondria targeting peptide (Amino acid 1-35 of the peptide sequence). The mature protein has a theoretical pI of 6.03.

== Function ==
Working in concert with general mitochondrial processing peptidase (MPP), MIPEP plays critical role in the maturation of a specific class of nuclear-encoded precursor proteins characterized by the motif, XRX(f)(F/L/I)XX(T/S/G)XXXX(f). Initially, peptidase MPP cleaves the precursors at positions two peptide bonds from the R residue, leaving a typical octapeptide at the protein N- terminus; subsequently, MIP cleaves the octapeptide, completing the final maturation of processed protein. A recent study showed that mitochondrial intermediate peptidase can degrade the transmembrane receptor Notch at its S5 site and assist Notch protein maturation.

== Clinical significance ==
In a GWAS (Genome-Wide Association Study) study of Chinese population, a significant association between high myopia and a variant at chromosome band region 13q12.12 was reported. MIPEP and C1QTNF9B genes locate in the same locus and appear expressed in the retina and retinal pigment epithelium (RPE) and are thus likely to be associated with high myopia. However, functional evidence linking MIPEP with myopia has yet to be provided.

Biallelic pathogenic variants in MIPEP present in infancy or early childhood with hypotonia (low muscle tone) and a rare type of cardiomyopathy, called left ventricular non-compaction. Cataracts may also be seen. In the four patients reported to date, the cardiomyopathy is progressive and results in death in the first few years of life.

Recent evidence has demonstrated that MIPEP is consistently reduced in insulin-resistant adipocytes, including primary adipocytes isolated from obese mice and 3T3-L1 adipocytes. Interestingly, the deletion of MIPEP in adipose tissue provides protection against diet-induced obesity and metabolic dysfunction. These findings have significant implications not only for the field of obesity but also for mitochondrial biology, as they suggest that mitochondrial proteases play a more complex role than previously hypothesized.

== First identification ==
Description of the human clinical phenotype of an autosomal recessive neuromuscular disorder caused by deficiency of the mitochondrial intermediate presequence protease (MIP), encoded by the gene MIPEP, was first reported by a collective with a lead author Mohammad Eldomery and senior corresponding author V. Reid Sutton in 2016 in the journal Genome Medicine. The index subject was diagnosed with left ventricular non-compaction cardiomyopathy (LVNC) and Wolf-Parkinson-White syndrome at 5 1/2 months of age. In an attempt to identify the etiology of this cardiac phenotype, a series of tests were performed, including clinical whole exome sequencing. Because the clinical diagnostic laboratory did not identify pathogenic variants in known disease-associated genes, re-analysis of the exome data was performed by Dr. Mohammad Eldomery as part of the Baylor-Johns Hopkins Center for Mendelian Genomics. Biallelic variants were identified in the MIPEP gene, which was known in yeast and other organisms to be important in mitochondrial protein processing. Because LVNC is seen in other mitochondrial disorders, this was considered the best candidate gene. After interrogating the Baylor Genetic Laboratory clinical database and submitting the MIPEP gene to GeneMatcher, four other affected individuals from three families were identified with biallelic variants in MIPEP. In all four patients, the phenotype is LVNC with severe hypotonia and developmental delay. All of the affected individuals, with the exception of the index case, died before 2 years of age from cardiac failure. Seizures and cataracts were also noted in some of the affected individuals. The MIPEP variants included missense variants, stop variants as well as a 1.4 Megabase deletion involving the MIPEP gene.
