= SUPT20H =

Protein-coding gene in the species Homo sapiens

Identifiers
- Aliases: SUPT20H, C13, C13orf19, FAM48A, P38IP, SPT20, FP757, SPT20 homolog, SAGA complex component
- External IDs: OMIM: 613417; MGI: 1929651; GeneCards: SUPT20H

Gene location (Human)
Chr.	Chromosome 13 (human)
Band	13q13.3	Start	37,009,312 bp
Band	13q13.3	End	37,059,713 bp

Gene location (Mouse)
Chr.	Chromosome 3 (mouse)
Band	3|3 C	Start	54,600,228 bp
Band	3|3 C	End	54,636,187 bp
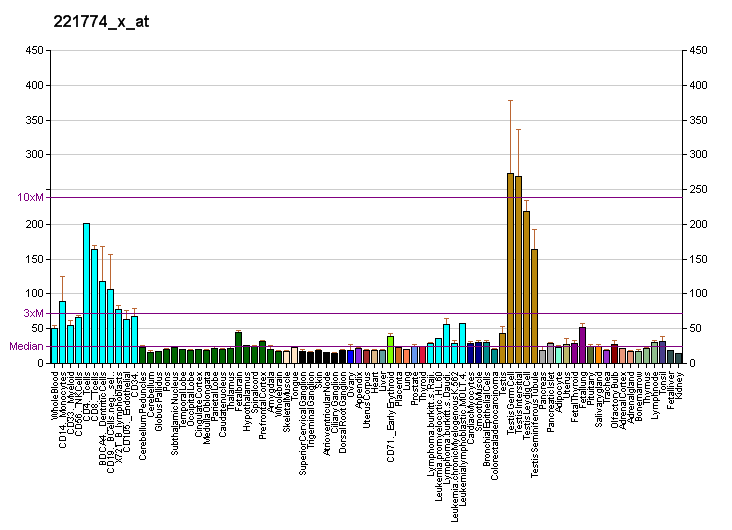

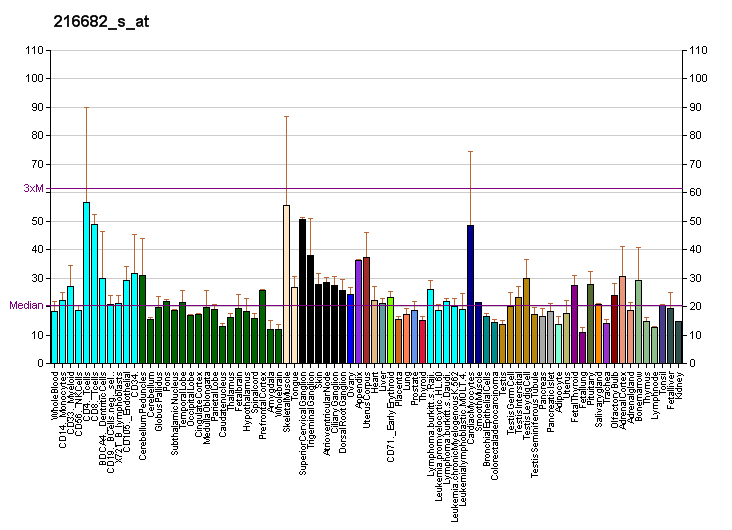

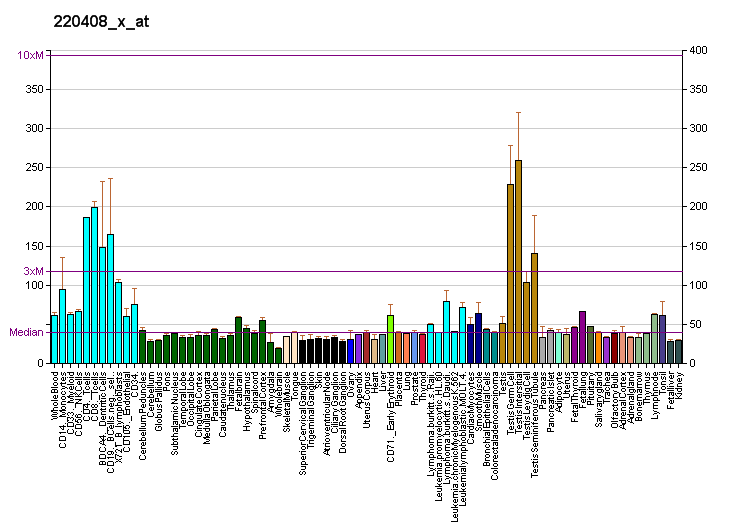
RNA expression pattern
Bgee	Human / Mouse (ortholog); Top expressed in: left testis; right testis; right uterine tube; ganglionic eminence; ventricular zone; canal of the cervix; right ovary; left ovary; anterior pituitary; body of uterus / Top expressed in: spermatocyte; spermatid; seminiferous tubule; genital tubercle; granulocyte; ascending aorta; aortic valve; internal carotid artery; external carotid artery; pituitary gland; More reference expression data
BioGPS	More reference expression data
Gene ontology
Molecular function	protein binding; transcription coregulator activity
Cellular component	SAGA-type complex; SAGA complex; nucleus; fibrillar center
Biological process	autophagy; multicellular organism development; gastrulation; regulation of nucleic acid-templated transcription; regulation of transcription by RNA polymerase II
Sources:Amigo / QuickGO
Orthologs
Databases	NCBI: entry; OMA: entry
Species	Human	Mouse
Entrez	55578	56790
Ensembl	ENSG00000102710	ENSMUSG00000027751
UniProt	Q8NEM7	Q7TT00
RefSeq (mRNA)	NM_001014286; NM_001278480; NM_001278481; NM_001278482; NM_017569	NM_019995; NM_001358015; NM_001358017
RefSeq (protein)	NP_001014308; NP_001265409; NP_001265410; NP_001265411; NP_060039	NP_064379; NP_001344944; NP_001344946; NP_001394692; NP_001394693 NP_001394694; NP_001394695; NP_001394696; NP_001394697; NP_001394698; NP_001394699; NP_001394700; NP_001394701; NP_001394702; NP_001394703; NP_001394704; NP_001394705; NP_001394706; NP_001394707; NP_001394708; NP_001394709; NP_001394710; NP_001394711; NP_001394712; NP_001394713; NP_001394714
Location (UCSC)	Chr 13: 37.01 – 37.06 Mb	Chr 3: 54.6 – 54.64 Mb
PubMed search
- Wikidata
View/Edit Human	View/Edit Mouse

SPT20 homolog is a protein that in humans is encoded by the SUPT20H gene.
