= Regulator of cell cycle RGCC =

Protein-coding gene in the species Homo sapiens

RGCC

Identifiers
- Aliases: RGCC, C13orf15, RGC-32, RGC32, bA157L14.2, regulator of cell cycle
- External IDs: OMIM: 610077; MGI: 1913464; HomoloGene: 8544; GeneCards: RGCC; OMA:RGCC - orthologs

Gene location (Human)
Chr.	Chromosome 13 (human)
Band	13q14.11	Start	41,457,550 bp
Band	13q14.11	End	41,470,871 bp

Gene location (Mouse)
Chr.	Chromosome 14 (mouse)
Band	14|14 D3	Start	79,526,196 bp
Band	14|14 D3	End	79,539,085 bp
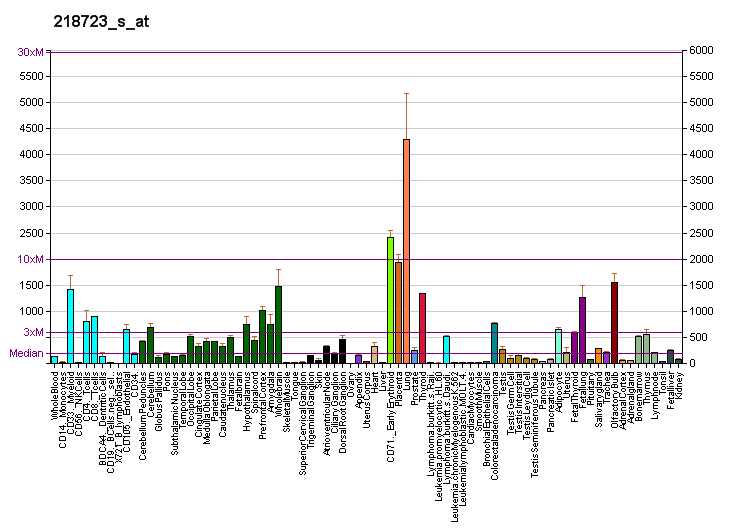
RNA expression pattern
Bgee	Human / Mouse (ortholog); Top expressed in: decidua; right lung; upper lobe of left lung; lower lobe of lung; parotid gland; olfactory bulb; tibial nerve; synovial joint; amniotic fluid; trabecular bone / Top expressed in: intercostal muscle; submandibular gland; tunica adventitia of aorta; white adipose tissue; left lung lobe; subcutaneous adipose tissue; brown adipose tissue; tibiofemoral joint; thymus; digastric muscle; More reference expression data
BioGPS	More reference expression data
Gene ontology
Molecular function	R-SMAD binding; protein kinase activator activity; protein binding; protein kinase binding
Cellular component	cytoplasm; centrosome; microtubule organizing center; cytoskeleton; nucleus; cytosol; nucleolus
Biological process	positive regulation of collagen biosynthetic process; negative regulation of blood vessel endothelial cell migration; negative regulation of cell-cell adhesion mediated by cadherin; complement activation; positive regulation of extracellular matrix assembly; positive regulation of DNA-binding transcription factor activity; negative regulation of mitotic cell cycle phase transition; positive regulation of epithelial to mesenchymal transition; positive regulation of extracellular matrix constituent secretion; regulation of cell cycle; negative regulation of endothelial cell proliferation; positive regulation of endothelial cell apoptotic process; positive regulation of gene expression; positive regulation of DNA biosynthetic process; negative regulation of angiogenesis; cell cycle; fibroblast activation; negative regulation of exit from mitosis; positive regulation of mitotic nuclear division; cellular response to hypoxia; negative regulation of fibroblast growth factor production; positive regulation of stress fiber assembly; positive regulation of transcription by RNA polymerase II; negative regulation of cell population proliferation; activation of protein kinase activity; DNA damage response, signal transduction by p53 class mediator resulting in cell cycle arrest; positive regulation of cyclin-dependent protein serine/threonine kinase activity; positive regulation of G1/S transition of mitotic cell cycle
Sources:Amigo / QuickGO
Orthologs
Species	Human	Mouse
Entrez	28984	66214
Ensembl	ENSG00000102760	ENSMUSG00000022018
UniProt	Q9H4X1	Q9DBX1
RefSeq (mRNA)	NM_014059	NM_025427
RefSeq (protein)	NP_054778	NP_079703
Location (UCSC)	Chr 13: 41.46 – 41.47 Mb	Chr 14: 79.53 – 79.54 Mb
PubMed search
- Wikidata
View/Edit Human	View/Edit Mouse

Regulator of cell cycle RGCC (RGCC) also known as response gene to complement 32 protein (RGC-32) is a protein that in humans is encoded by the RGCC gene.

== Function ==
This gene is thought to regulate cell cycle progression. It is induced by p53 in response to DNA damage, or by sublytic levels of complement system proteins that result in activation of the cell cycle. The encoded protein localizes to the cytoplasm during interphase and to centrosomes during mitosis. The protein forms a complex with polo-like kinase 1. The protein also translocates to the nucleus in response to treatment with complement system proteins, and can associate with and increase the kinase activity of cell division cycle 2 protein. In different assays and cell types, overexpression of this protein has been shown to activate or suppress cell cycle progression.
