= TM9SF2 =

Protein-coding gene in the species Homo sapiens

Identifiers
- Aliases: TM9SF2, P76, transmembrane 9 superfamily member 2
- External IDs: OMIM: 604678; MGI: 1915309; HomoloGene: 21004; GeneCards: TM9SF2; OMA:TM9SF2 - orthologs

Gene location (Human)
Chr.	Chromosome 13 (human)
Band	13q32.3	Start	99,446,311 bp
Band	13q32.3	End	99,564,048 bp

Gene location (Mouse)
Chr.	Chromosome 14 (mouse)
Band	14 E5|14 65.86 cM	Start	122,344,450 bp
Band	14 E5|14 65.86 cM	End	122,397,016 bp
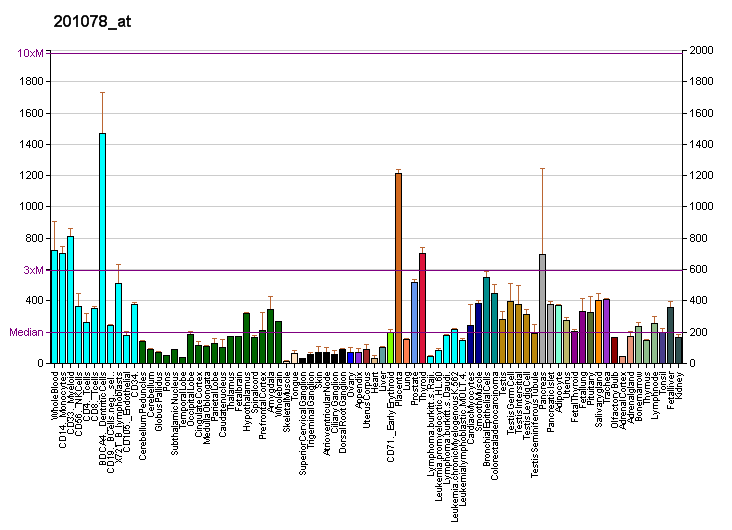
RNA expression pattern
Bgee	Human / Mouse (ortholog); Top expressed in: mucosa of sigmoid colon; bronchial epithelial cell; jejunal mucosa; corpus epididymis; rectum; duodenum; mucosa of ileum; islet of Langerhans; skin of thigh; mucosa of nose / Top expressed in: Paneth cell; ciliary body; Epithelium of choroid plexus; iris; vestibular membrane of cochlear duct; lacrimal gland; retinal pigment epithelium; conjunctival fornix; parotid gland; condyle; More reference expression data
BioGPS	More reference expression data
Orthologs
Species	Human	Mouse
Entrez	9375	68059
Ensembl	ENSG00000125304	ENSMUSG00000025544
UniProt	Q99805	P58021
RefSeq (mRNA)	NM_004800	NM_080556
RefSeq (protein)	NP_004791	NP_542123
Location (UCSC)	Chr 13: 99.45 – 99.56 Mb	Chr 14: 122.34 – 122.4 Mb
PubMed search
- Wikidata
View/Edit Human	View/Edit Mouse

Transmembrane 9 superfamily member 2 is a protein that in humans is encoded by the TM9SF2 gene.
