= Integrin subunit beta like 1 =

Protein-coding gene in the species Homo sapiens

ITGBL1

Identifiers
- Aliases: ITGBL1, OSCP, TIED, integrin subunit beta like 1
- External IDs: OMIM: 604234; MGI: 2443439; GeneCards: ITGBL1

Gene location (Human)
Chr.	Chromosome 13 (human)
Band	13q33.1	Start	101,452,593 bp
Band	13q33.1	End	101,720,856 bp

Gene location (Mouse)
Chr.	Chromosome 14 (mouse)
Band	14|14 E5	Start	123,897,383 bp
Band	14|14 E5	End	124,213,030 bp
RNA expression pattern
Bgee	Human / Mouse (ortholog); Top expressed in: frontal pole; paraflocculus of cerebellum; middle frontal gyrus; Descending thoracic aorta; ascending aorta; Achilles tendon; pericardium; synovial joint; right coronary artery; popliteal artery / Top expressed in: calvaria; tunica media of zone of aorta; sciatic nerve; ascending aorta; aortic valve; interventricular septum; utricle; stroma of bone marrow; vestibular sensory epithelium; skin of external ear; More reference expression data
BioGPS	n/a
Gene ontology
Molecular function	integrin binding
Cellular component	extracellular region; plasma membrane; focal adhesion; integrin complex; cell surface
Biological process	cell adhesion; cell-matrix adhesion; integrin-mediated signaling pathway; cell migration; cell adhesion mediated by integrin
Sources:Amigo / QuickGO
Orthologs
Databases	NCBI: entry; OMA: entry
Species	Human	Mouse
Entrez	9358	223272
Ensembl	ENSG00000198542	ENSMUSG00000032925
UniProt	O95965	Q8VDV0
RefSeq (mRNA)	NM_001271754; NM_001271755; NM_001271756; NM_004791	NM_145467
RefSeq (protein)	NP_001258683; NP_001258684; NP_001258685; NP_004782	NP_663442
Location (UCSC)	Chr 13: 101.45 – 101.72 Mb	Chr 14: 123.9 – 124.21 Mb
PubMed search
- Wikidata
View/Edit Human	View/Edit Mouse

Integrin subunit beta like 1 is a protein that in humans is encoded by the ITGBL1 gene.

== Function ==
This gene encodes a beta integrin-related protein that is a member of the EGF-like protein family. The encoded protein contains integrin-like cysteine-rich repeats. Alternative splicing results in multiple transcript variants. [provided by RefSeq, Nov 2012].
