= LINC00327 =

Protein-coding gene in humans

Identifiers
- Aliases: LINC00327, NCRNA00327, long intergenic non-protein coding RNA 327
- External IDs: GeneCards: LINC00327

Gene location (Human)
Chr.	Chromosome 13 (human)
Band	13q12.12	Start	23,465,776 bp
Band	13q12.12	End	23,487,712 bp
RNA expression pattern
Bgee	Human / Mouse (ortholog); Top expressed in: buccal mucosa cell; testicle; gonad; sural nerve; stromal cell of endometrium; ventricular zone; right auricle of heart; skeletal muscle tissue; muscle of thigh; epithelium of colon / n/a; More reference expression data
BioGPS	n/a
Orthologs
Databases	NCBI: entry; OMA: entry
Species	Human	Mouse
Entrez	100506697	n/a
Ensembl	ENSG00000232977	n/a
UniProt	n a	n/a
RefSeq (mRNA)	n/a	n/a
RefSeq (protein)	n/a	n/a
Location (UCSC)	Chr 13: 23.47 – 23.49 Mb	n/a
PubMed search		n/a
- Wikidata
View/Edit Human

Long intergenic non-protein coding RNA 327 is an lncRNA encoded by the LINC00327 gene.
