= LINC00346 =

PRECSIT

Identifiers
- Aliases: PRECSIT, C13orf29, NCRNA00346, long intergenic non-protein coding RNA 346, p53 regulated carcinoma associated Stat3 activating long intergenic non-protein coding transcript, LINC00346
- External IDs: GeneCards: PRECSIT

Gene location (Human)
Chr.	Chromosome 13 (human)
Band	13q34	Start	110,863,987 bp
Band	13q34	End	110,870,330 bp
RNA expression pattern
Bgee	Human / Mouse (ortholog); Top expressed in: skeletal muscle tissue; gastrocnemius muscle; muscle of thigh; placenta; Achilles tendon; endometrium; Descending thoracic aorta; ascending aorta; stromal cell of endometrium; smooth muscle tissue / n/a; More reference expression data
BioGPS	n/a
Orthologs
Databases	NCBI: entry; OMA: entry
Species	Human	Mouse
Entrez	283487	n/a
Ensembl	ENSG00000255874	n/a
UniProt	n a	n/a
RefSeq (mRNA)	NM_178514	n/a
RefSeq (protein)	n/a	n/a
Location (UCSC)	Chr 13: 110.86 – 110.87 Mb	n/a
PubMed search		n/a
- Wikidata
View/Edit Human

Long intergenic non-protein coding RNA 346 is an lncRNA that in humans is encoded by the LINC00346 gene.
