= TDRD3 =

Protein-coding gene in the species Homo sapiens

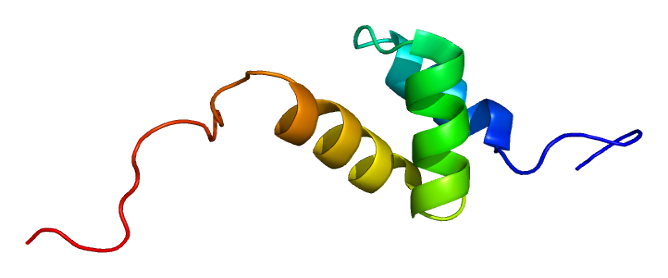

Identifiers
- Aliases: TDRD3, tudor domain containing 3
- External IDs: OMIM: 614392; MGI: 2444023; GeneCards: TDRD3
Available structures
PDB	Ortholog search: PDBe RCSB
PDB	List of PDB id codes 1WJI, 2LTO, 3PMT, 3PNW, 3S6W

Gene location (Human)
Chr.	Chromosome 13 (human)
Band	13q21.2	Start	60,396,457 bp
Band	13q21.2	End	60,573,878 bp

Gene location (Mouse)
Chr.	Chromosome 14 (mouse)
Band	14|14 E1	Start	87,654,075 bp
Band	14|14 E1	End	87,782,940 bp
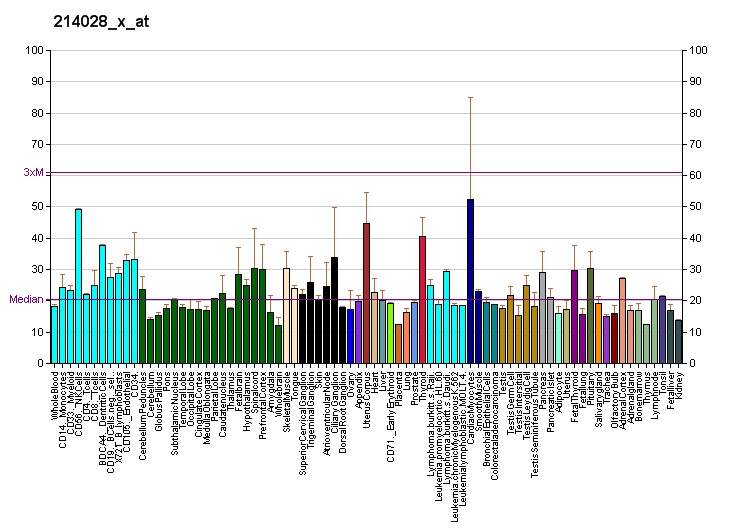

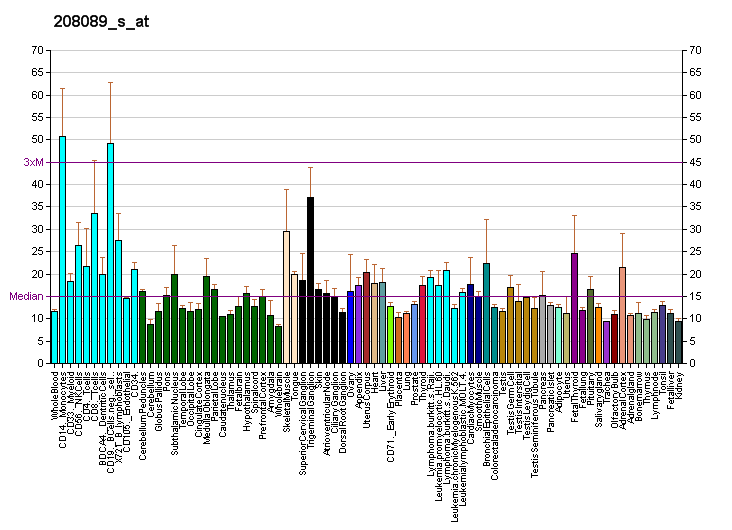
RNA expression pattern
Bgee	Human / Mouse (ortholog); Top expressed in: Achilles tendon; ventricular zone; epithelium of colon; tendon of biceps brachii; gastrocnemius muscle; muscle of thigh; ganglionic eminence; sural nerve; body of pancreas; corpus callosum / Top expressed in: zygote; genital tubercle; primary oocyte; medial ganglionic eminence; spermatocyte; interventricular septum; tail of embryo; spermatid; Rostral migratory stream; Epithelium of choroid plexus; More reference expression data
BioGPS	More reference expression data
Gene ontology
Molecular function	methylated histone binding; transcription coactivator activity; chromatin binding; protein binding; RNA binding
Cellular component	cytoplasm; exon-exon junction complex; nucleus; nucleoplasm; Golgi apparatus; cytosol
Biological process	regulation of nucleic acid-templated transcription; chromatin organization; positive regulation of nucleic acid-templated transcription
Sources:Amigo / QuickGO
Orthologs
Databases	NCBI: entry; OMA: entry
Species	Human	Mouse
Entrez	81550	219249
Ensembl	ENSG00000083544	ENSMUSG00000022019
UniProt	Q9H7E2	Q91W18
RefSeq (mRNA)	NM_001146070; NM_001146071; NM_030794	NM_001253755; NM_172605
RefSeq (protein)	NP_001139542; NP_001139543; NP_110421	NP_001240684; NP_766193
Location (UCSC)	Chr 13: 60.4 – 60.57 Mb	Chr 14: 87.65 – 87.78 Mb
PubMed search
- Wikidata
View/Edit Human	View/Edit Mouse

Tudor domain-containing protein 3 is a protein that in humans is encoded by the TDRD3 gene. It contains a Tudor domain and UBA protein domain and has three distinct Protein isoforms.
