= UBL3 =

Protein-coding gene in the species Homo sapiens

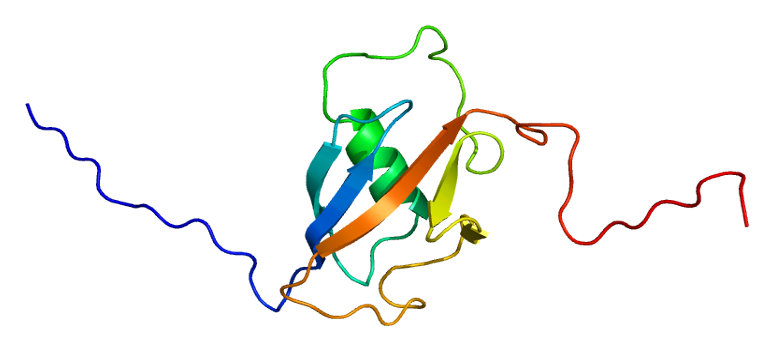
Available structures
PDB	Ortholog search: PDBe RCSB
PDB	List of PDB id codes 2GOW

Identifiers
- Aliases: UBL3, HCG-1, PNSC1, ubiquitin like 3
- External IDs: OMIM: 604711; MGI: 1344373; HomoloGene: 5153; GeneCards: UBL3; OMA:UBL3 - orthologs

Gene location (Human)
Chr.	Chromosome 13 (human)
Band	13q12.3	Start	29,764,371 bp
Band	13q12.3	End	29,850,617 bp

Gene location (Mouse)
Chr.	Chromosome 5 (mouse)
Band	5|5 G3	Start	148,504,635 bp
Band	5|5 G3	End	148,552,789 bp
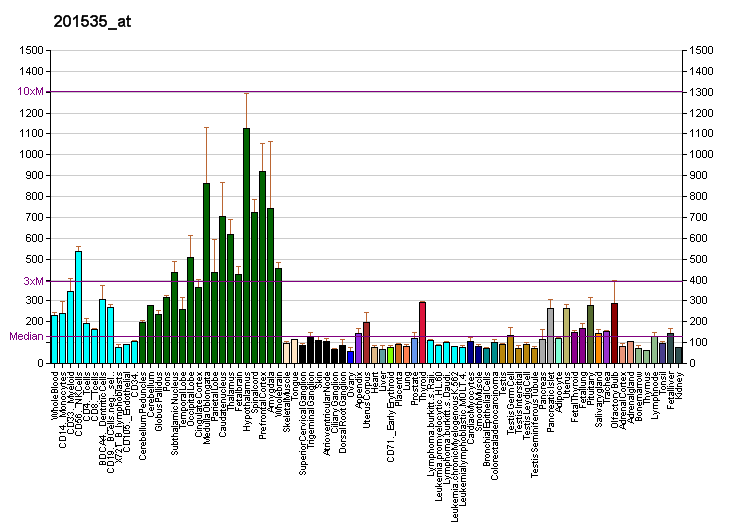

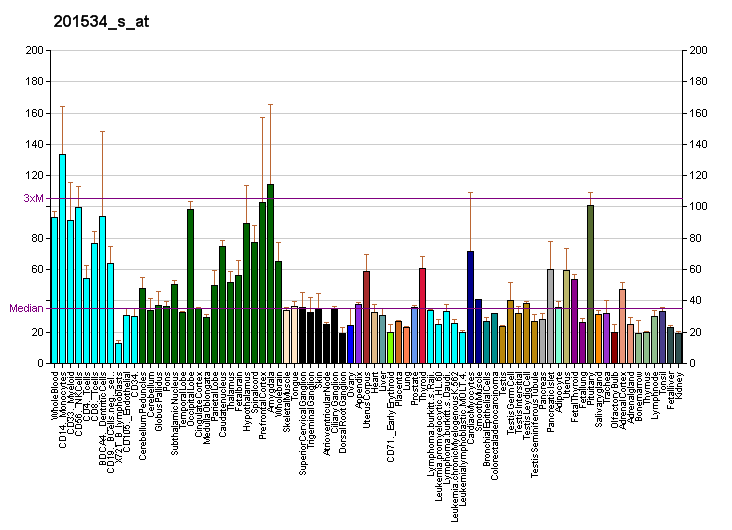
RNA expression pattern
Bgee	Human / Mouse (ortholog); Top expressed in: inferior olivary nucleus; amniotic fluid; dorsal motor nucleus of vagus nerve; pars reticulata; subthalamic nucleus; pars compacta; external globus pallidus; superior vestibular nucleus; postcentral gyrus; Region I of hippocampus proper / Top expressed in: extensor digitorum longus muscle; Rostral migratory stream; plantaris muscle; corneal stroma; extraocular muscle; olfactory epithelium; cardiac muscle tissue of left ventricle; CA3 field; dorsal striatum; spermatid; More reference expression data
BioGPS	More reference expression data
Orthologs
Species	Human	Mouse
Entrez	5412	24109
Ensembl	ENSG00000122042	ENSMUSG00000001687
UniProt	O95164	Q9Z2M6
RefSeq (mRNA)	NM_007106	NM_011908
RefSeq (protein)	NP_009037	NP_036038; NP_001346128; NP_001346129; NP_001346130; NP_001346131
Location (UCSC)	Chr 13: 29.76 – 29.85 Mb	Chr 5: 148.5 – 148.55 Mb
PubMed search
- Wikidata
View/Edit Human	View/Edit Mouse

Ubiquitin-like protein 3 is a protein that in humans is encoded by the UBL3 gene.

In melanocytic cells UBL3 gene expression may be regulated by MITF.
