= ZMYM2 =

Protein-coding gene in the species Homo sapiens

Identifiers
- Aliases: ZMYM2, FIM, MYM, RAMP, SCLL, ZNF198, zinc finger MYM-type containing 2, NECRC
- External IDs: OMIM: 602221; MGI: 1923257; GeneCards: ZMYM2

Gene location (Human)
Chr.	Chromosome 13 (human)
Band	13q12.11	Start	19,958,677 bp
Band	13q12.11	End	20,091,829 bp

Gene location (Mouse)
Chr.	Chromosome 14 (mouse)
Band	14|14 C3	Start	57,124,110 bp
Band	14|14 C3	End	57,200,158 bp
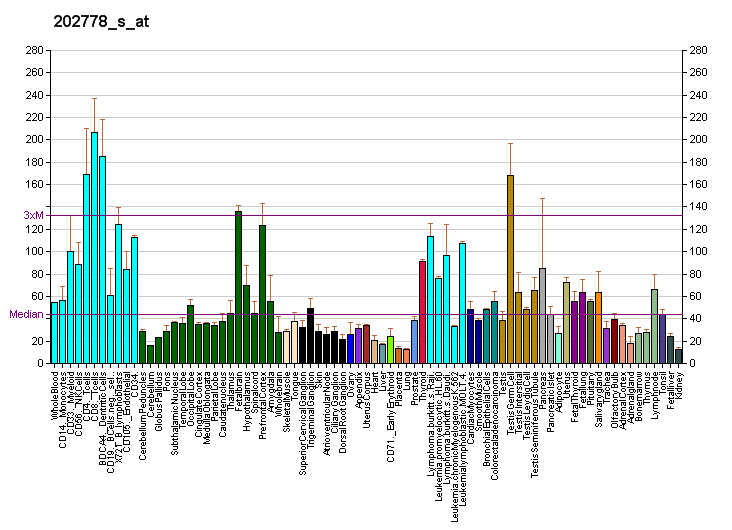

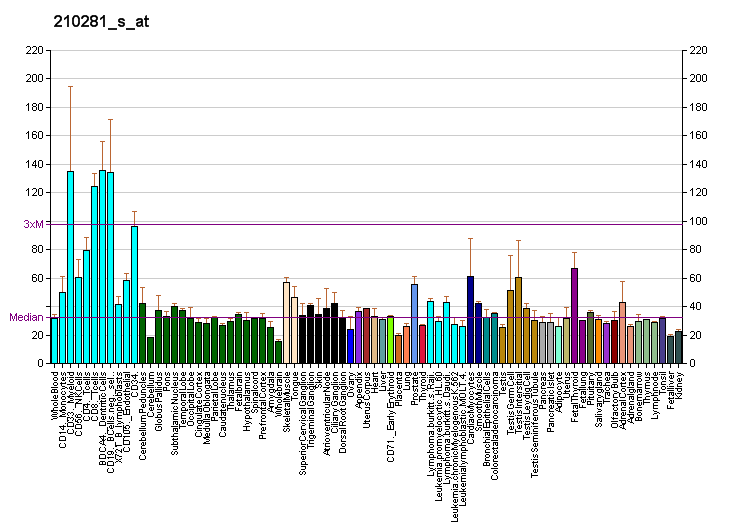

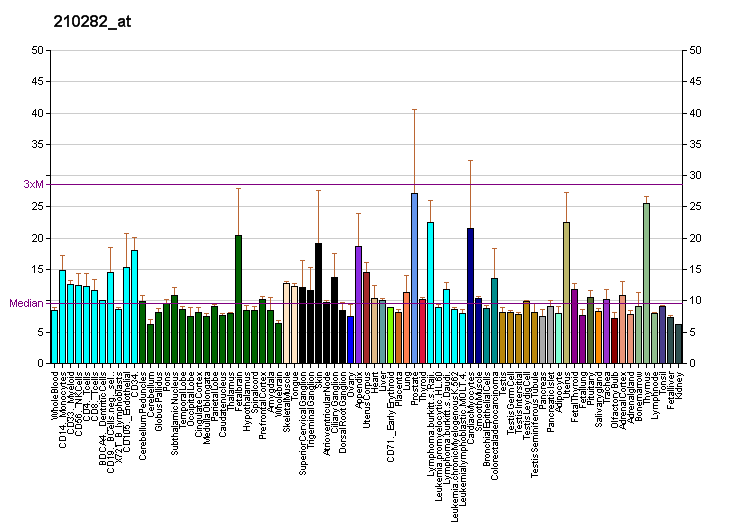
RNA expression pattern
Bgee	Human / Mouse (ortholog); Top expressed in: sperm; oocyte; secondary oocyte; ganglionic eminence; buccal mucosa cell; right testis; Achilles tendon; left testis; testicle; ventricular zone / Top expressed in: hand; genital tubercle; tail of embryo; spermatocyte; ganglionic eminence; ventricular zone; medial ganglionic eminence; epiblast; neural layer of retina; abdominal wall; More reference expression data
BioGPS	More reference expression data
Gene ontology
Molecular function	zinc ion binding; metal ion binding; ubiquitin conjugating enzyme binding; DNA-binding transcription factor activity, RNA polymerase II-specific; DNA binding; protein tyrosine kinase activity; protein binding
Cellular component	cytosol; nucleus; PML body; cytoplasm; nucleoplasm
Biological process	regulation of transcription, DNA-templated; transcription, DNA-templated; cytoskeleton organization; regulation of cell morphogenesis; multicellular organism development; peptidyl-tyrosine phosphorylation; regulation of transcription by RNA polymerase II; biological process
Sources:Amigo / QuickGO
Orthologs
Databases	NCBI: entry; OMA: entry
Species	Human	Mouse
Entrez	7750	76007
Ensembl	ENSG00000121741	ENSMUSG00000021945
UniProt	Q9UBW7	Q9CU65
RefSeq (mRNA)	NM_001190964; NM_001190965; NM_003453; NM_197968; NM_001353157 NM_001353159; NM_001353161; NM_001353162; NM_001353163; NM_001353164; NM_001353165	NM_029498; NM_177627; NM_001360643
RefSeq (protein)	NP_001177893; NP_001177894; NP_003444; NP_932072; NP_001340086 NP_001340088; NP_001340090; NP_001340091; NP_001340092; NP_001340093; NP_001340094	NP_083774; NP_001347572; NP_808295
Location (UCSC)	Chr 13: 19.96 – 20.09 Mb	Chr 14: 57.12 – 57.2 Mb
PubMed search
- Wikidata
View/Edit Human	View/Edit Mouse

Zinc finger MYM-type protein 2 is a protein that in humans is encoded by the ZMYM2 gene.

== See also ==
- Chromosome 13 (human)
- Myeloproliferative neoplasm
- Zinc finger protein
