= ARGLU1 =

Protein-coding gene in the species Homo sapiens

Identifiers
- Aliases: ARGLU1, arginine and glutamate rich 1
- External IDs: OMIM: 614046; MGI: 2442985; HomoloGene: 9960; GeneCards: ARGLU1; OMA:ARGLU1 - orthologs

Gene location (Human)
Chr.	Chromosome 13 (human)
Band	13q33.3	Start	106,541,673 bp
Band	13q33.3	End	106,568,137 bp

Gene location (Mouse)
Chr.	Chromosome 8 (mouse)
Band	8|8 A1.1	Start	8,715,075 bp
Band	8|8 A1.1	End	8,740,521 bp
RNA expression pattern
Bgee	Human / Mouse (ortholog); Top expressed in: sural nerve; right uterine tube; germinal epithelium; epithelium of nasopharynx; hair follicle; right lung; right hemisphere of cerebellum; seminal vesicula; skin of hip; superficial temporal artery / Top expressed in: renal corpuscle; medullary collecting duct; ciliary body; epithelium of lens; vestibular membrane of cochlear duct; vestibular sensory epithelium; Paneth cell; primitive streak; corneal stroma; conjunctival fornix; More reference expression data
BioGPS	n/a
Gene ontology
Molecular function	protein binding; cadherin binding
Cellular component	mitochondrion; nucleus; nucleoplasm
Biological process	regulation of transcription, DNA-templated; transcription, DNA-templated
Sources:Amigo / QuickGO
Orthologs
Species	Human	Mouse
Entrez	55082	234023
Ensembl	ENSG00000134884	ENSMUSG00000040459
UniProt	Q9NWB6	Q3UL36
RefSeq (mRNA)	NM_018011	NM_176849
RefSeq (protein)	NP_060481	NP_789819
Location (UCSC)	Chr 13: 106.54 – 106.57 Mb	Chr 8: 8.72 – 8.74 Mb
PubMed search
- Wikidata
View/Edit Human	View/Edit Mouse

Arginine and glutamate-rich protein 1 is a protein that in humans is encoded by the ARGLU1 gene located at 13q33.3.

The protein product of this gene has been proposed as a MED1-interacting protein required for estrogen-dependent gene transcription and breast cancer cell growth.

The ARGLU1 gene expresses at least three distinct RNA splice isoforms - a fully spliced isoform coding for the protein, an isoform containing a retained intron that is detained in the nucleus, and an isoform containing an alternative exon that targets the transcript for nonsense mediated decay. Furthermore, ARGLU1 contains a long, highly evolutionarily conserved sequence known as an Ultraconserved Element (UCE) that is within the retained intron and overlaps the alternative exon.

== Function ==
ARGLU1 has been characterized as a regulator of both transcription and alternative splicing, and as important for embryonic development. In mouse loss-of-function models, deletion of Arglu1 caused widespread alternative-splicing defects and cortical developmental abnormalities associated with apoptosis.
