= ESD (gene) =

Protein-coding gene in the species Homo sapiens

Identifiers
- Aliases: ESD, FGH, esterase D
- External IDs: OMIM: 133280; MGI: 3781082; GeneCards: ESD
Available structures
PDB	Human UniProt search: PDBe RCSB
PDB	List of PDB id codes 3FCX
Enzyme activity
EC #	BRENDA	ExPASy	KEGG	MetaCyc
3.1.1.56	↗	↗	↗	↗
3.1.2.12	↗	↗	↗	↗

Gene location (Human)
Chr.	Chromosome 13 (human)
Band	13q14.2	Start	46,771,256 bp
Band	13q14.2	End	46,797,420 bp
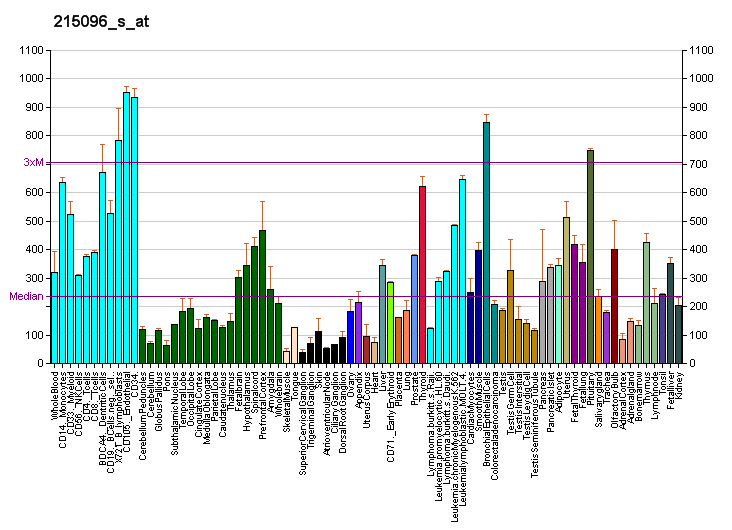

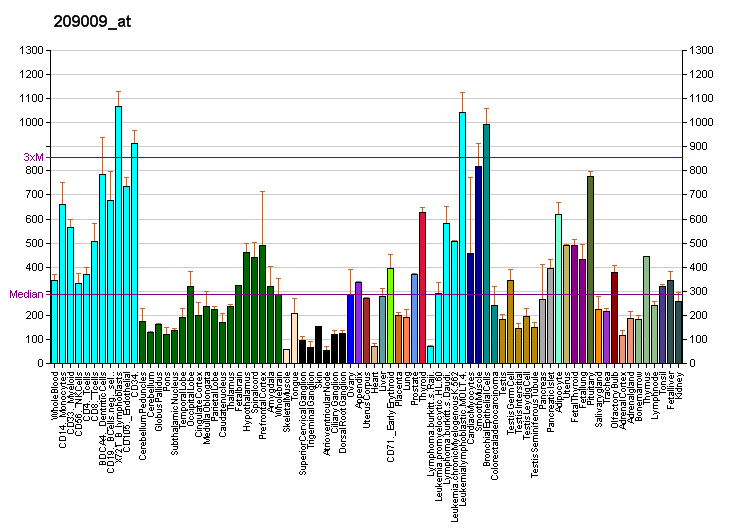
RNA expression pattern
Bgee	Human / Mouse (ortholog); Top expressed in: popliteal artery; tibial arteries; Descending thoracic aorta; hair follicle; germinal epithelium; right coronary artery; Epithelium of choroid plexus; optic nerve; ganglionic eminence; retinal pigment epithelium / n/a; More reference expression data
BioGPS	More reference expression data
Gene ontology
Molecular function	S-formylglutathione hydrolase activity; methylumbelliferyl-acetate deacetylase activity; carboxylic ester hydrolase activity; protein binding; hydrolase activity; hydrolase activity, acting on ester bonds; identical protein binding
Cellular component	cytoplasm; extracellular exosome; endoplasmic reticulum lumen; cytoplasmic vesicle; cytosol
Biological process	formaldehyde catabolic process; glutathione derivative biosynthetic process; biological process
Sources:Amigo / QuickGO
Orthologs
Databases	NCBI: entry; OMA: entry
Species	Human	Mouse
Entrez	2098	100040682
Ensembl	ENSG00000139684	n/a
UniProt	P10768	n/a
RefSeq (mRNA)	NM_001984	XM_036158963
RefSeq (protein)	NP_001975	n/a
Location (UCSC)	Chr 13: 46.77 – 46.8 Mb	n/a
PubMed search
- Wikidata
View/Edit Human	View/Edit Mouse

S-formylglutathione hydrolase is an enzyme that in humans is encoded by the ESD gene.
