= CAB39L =

Protein-coding gene in the species Homo sapiens

Identifiers
- Aliases: CAB39L, MO25-BETA, MO2L, bA103J18.3, calcium binding protein 39 like
- External IDs: OMIM: 612175; MGI: 1914081; GeneCards: CAB39L
Available structures
PDB	Ortholog search: PDBe RCSB
PDB	List of PDB id codes 3ZHP

Gene location (Human)
Chr.	Chromosome 13 (human)
Band	13q14.2	Start	49,308,650 bp
Band	13q14.2	End	49,444,064 bp

Gene location (Mouse)
Chr.	Chromosome 14 (mouse)
Band	14|14 C3	Start	59,678,421 bp
Band	14|14 C3	End	59,823,213 bp
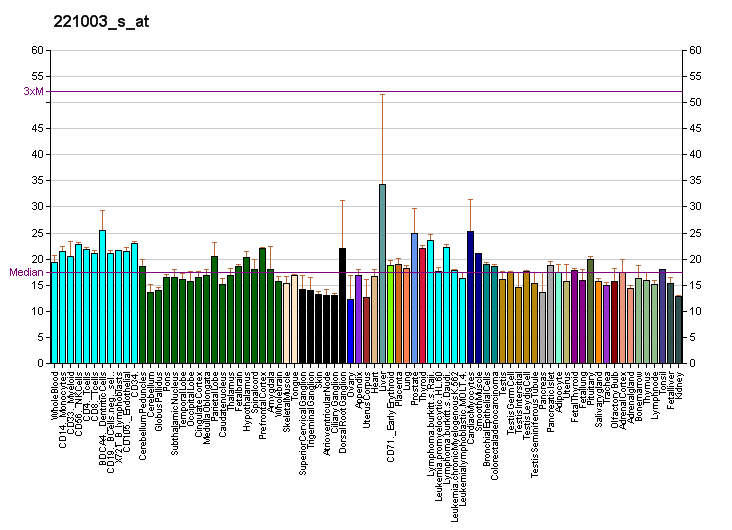
RNA expression pattern
Bgee	Human / Mouse (ortholog); Top expressed in: decidua; Achilles tendon; sural nerve; muscle layer of sigmoid colon; endothelial cell; sperm; popliteal artery; tibial arteries; prefrontal cortex; right adrenal cortex / Top expressed in: Epithelium of choroid plexus; choroid plexus of fourth ventricle; vestibular membrane of cochlear duct; spermatid; lacrimal gland; seminal vesicula; transitional epithelium of urinary bladder; seminiferous tubule; parotid gland; superior surface of tongue; More reference expression data
BioGPS	More reference expression data
Gene ontology
Molecular function	protein binding; protein serine/threonine kinase activity
Cellular component	cytosol; intracellular anatomical structure
Biological process	signal transduction
Sources:Amigo / QuickGO
Orthologs
Databases	NCBI: entry; OMA: entry
Species	Human	Mouse
Entrez	81617	69008
Ensembl	ENSG00000102547	ENSMUSG00000021981
UniProt	Q9H9S4	Q9DB16
RefSeq (mRNA)	NM_001079670; NM_001287337; NM_001287338; NM_001287339; NM_030925	NM_026908; NM_001360591; NM_001360592; NM_001360593
RefSeq (protein)	NP_001073138; NP_001274266; NP_001274267; NP_001274268; NP_112187	NP_081184; NP_001347520; NP_001347521; NP_001347522
Location (UCSC)	Chr 13: 49.31 – 49.44 Mb	Chr 14: 59.68 – 59.82 Mb
PubMed search
- Wikidata
View/Edit Human	View/Edit Mouse

Calcium-binding protein 39-like is a protein that in humans is encoded by the CAB39L gene.
