= Olfactomedin 4 =

Protein-coding gene in the species Homo sapiens

OLFM4

Identifiers
- Aliases: OLFM4, GC1, GW112, OLM4, OlfD, UNQ362, bA209J19.1, hGC-1, hOLfD, olfactomedin 4
- External IDs: OMIM: 614061; MGI: 2685142; GeneCards: OLFM4

Gene location (Human)
Chr.	Chromosome 13 (human)
Band	13q14.3	Start	53,028,813 bp
Band	13q14.3	End	53,052,057 bp

Gene location (Mouse)
Chr.	Chromosome 14 (mouse)
Band	14|14 D3	Start	80,221,521 bp
Band	14|14 D3	End	80,260,579 bp
RNA expression pattern
Bgee	Human / Mouse (ortholog); Top expressed in: urethra; jejunal mucosa; duodenum; mucosa of ileum; beta cell; rectum; cecum; appendix; mucosa of transverse colon; bone marrow / Top expressed in: Paneth cell; granulocyte; duodenum; ileum; jejunum; epithelium of small intestine; conjunctival fornix; islet of Langerhans; otolith organ; utricle; More reference expression data
BioGPS	n/a
Gene ontology
Molecular function	catalytic activity; protein binding; protein homodimerization activity; cadherin binding
Cellular component	perinuclear region of cytoplasm; plasma membrane; azurophil granule; specific granule; extracellular exosome; secretory granule; mitochondrion; extracellular region; extracellular space; specific granule lumen; tertiary granule lumen
Biological process	regulation of apoptotic process; positive regulation of substrate adhesion-dependent cell spreading; regulation of phagocytosis; cell adhesion; protein homooligomerization; regulation of necrotic cell death; regulation of neutrophil extravasation; neutrophil degranulation
Sources:Amigo / QuickGO
Orthologs
Databases	NCBI: entry; OMA: entry
Species	Human	Mouse
Entrez	10562	380924
Ensembl	ENSG00000102837	ENSMUSG00000022026
UniProt	Q6UX06	Q3UZZ4
RefSeq (mRNA)	NM_006418	NM_001030294; NM_001351947
RefSeq (protein)	NP_006409	NP_001025465; NP_001338876
Location (UCSC)	Chr 13: 53.03 – 53.05 Mb	Chr 14: 80.22 – 80.26 Mb
PubMed search
- Wikidata
View/Edit Human	View/Edit Mouse

Olfactomedin 4 is a protein that in humans is encoded by the OLFM4 gene.

== Function ==
This gene was originally cloned from human myeloblasts and found to be selectively expressed in inflamed colonic epithelium. This gene encodes a member of the olfactomedin family. The encoded protein is an antiapoptotic factor that promotes tumor growth and is an extracellular matrix glycoprotein that facilitates cell adhesion. [provided by RefSeq, Mar 2011].
