= CPB2 antisense RNA 1 =

Non-coding RNA found in humans

CPB2-AS1

Identifiers
- Aliases: CPB2-AS1, CPB2 antisense RNA 1
- External IDs: GeneCards: CPB2-AS1

Gene location (Human)
Chr.	Chromosome 13 (human)
Band	13q14.13	Start	46,052,497 bp
Band	13q14.13	End	46,161,379 bp
RNA expression pattern
Bgee	Human / Mouse (ortholog); Top expressed in: C1 segment; endothelial cell; corpus callosum; amygdala; primary visual cortex; substantia nigra; Brodmann area 46; putamen; bone marrow cell; hippocampus proper / n/a; More reference expression data
BioGPS	n/a
Orthologs
Databases	NCBI: entry; OMA: entry
Species	Human	Mouse
Entrez	100509894	n/a
Ensembl	ENSG00000235903	n/a
UniProt	n a	n/a
RefSeq (mRNA)	n/a	n/a
RefSeq (protein)	n/a	n/a
Location (UCSC)	Chr 13: 46.05 – 46.16 Mb	n/a
PubMed search		n/a
- Wikidata
View/Edit Human

CPB2 antisense RNA 1 is a non-coding RNA that in humans is encoded by the CPB2-AS1 gene.
