= Partial monosomy 13q =

- Chromosome 13 which is involved in this condition

Partial monosomy of chromosome 13q is a monosomy that results from the loss of all or part of the long arm of chromosome 13 in human beings. It is a rare genetic disorder which results in severe congenital abnormalities which are frequently fatal at an early age. Up until 2003, more than 125 cases had been documented in medical literature.

== Symptoms and signs ==
Symptoms vary from case to case, and may correlate to how much of the chromosome is missing. Symptoms that are frequently observed with the condition include:

- Low birth weight
- Malformations of the head
- Eye abnormalities
- Defects of the hands and feet, polydactyly
- Reproductive abnormalities (males)
- Psychological and motor retardation
