= DLEU1 =

Identifiers
- Aliases: DLEU1, BCMS, BCMS1, DLB1, DLEU2, LEU1, LEU2, LINC00021, NCRNA00021, XTP6, deleted in lymphocytic leukemia 1 (non-protein coding), deleted in lymphocytic leukemia 1
- External IDs: OMIM: 605765; GeneCards: DLEU1

Gene location (Human)
Chr.	Chromosome 13 (human)
Band	13q14.2-q14.3	Start	50,082,169 bp
Band	13q14.2-q14.3	End	50,906,856 bp
RNA expression pattern
Bgee	Human / Mouse (ortholog); Top expressed in: gonad; testicle; islet of Langerhans; sural nerve; epithelium of colon; ventricular zone; Achilles tendon; monocyte; bone marrow cell; muscle of thigh / n/a; More reference expression data
BioGPS	n/a
Orthologs
Databases	NCBI: entry; OMA: entry
Species	Human	Mouse
Entrez	10301	n/a
Ensembl	ENSG00000176124	n/a
UniProt	n a	n/a
RefSeq (mRNA)	NM_005887	n/a
RefSeq (protein)	n/a	n/a
Location (UCSC)	Chr 13: 50.08 – 50.91 Mb	n/a
PubMed search		n/a
- Wikidata
View/Edit Human

In molecular biology, deleted in lymphocytic leukemia 1 (non-protein coding), also known as DLEU1, is a long non-coding RNA. In humans it is located on chromosome 13q14. The DLEU1 gene was originally identified as a potential tumour suppressor gene and is often deleted in patients with B-cell chronic lymphocytic leukemia. It was later discovered to be a long non-coding RNA with over 20 different splice variants.

== See also ==
- Long noncoding RNA
