= RCBTB1 =

Protein-coding gene in the species Homo sapiens

Identifiers
- Aliases: RCBTB1, CLLD7, CLLL7, GLP, RCC1 and BTB domain containing protein 1, RDEOA
- External IDs: OMIM: 607867; MGI: 1918580; GeneCards: RCBTB1

Gene location (Mouse)
Chr.	Chromosome 14 (mouse)
Band	14|14 C3	Start	59,438,658 bp
Band	14|14 C3	End	59,474,714 bp
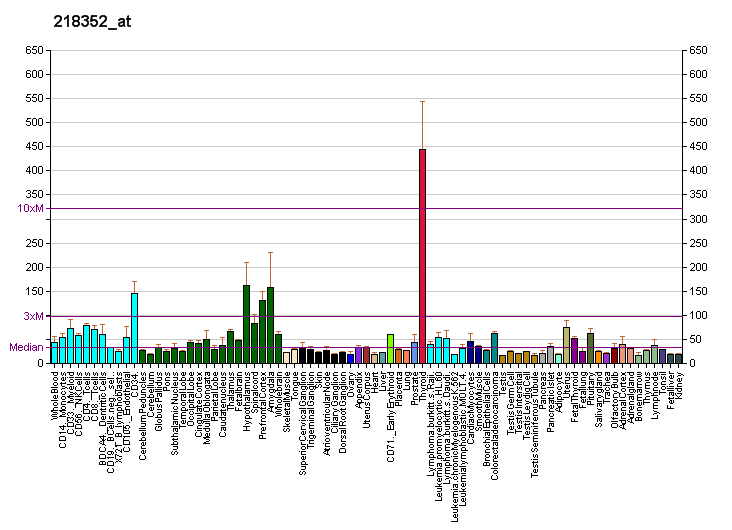
RNA expression pattern
Bgee	Human / Mouse (ortholog); n/a / Top expressed in: gastrula; deep cerebellar nuclei; tail of embryo; ventricular zone; submandibular gland; ganglionic eminence; genital tubercle; globus pallidus; ventral tegmental area; pineal gland
BioGPS	More reference expression data
Orthologs
Databases	NCBI: entry; OMA: entry
Species	Human	Mouse
Entrez	55213	71330
Ensembl	ENSG00000136144	ENSMUSG00000035469
UniProt	Q8NDN9	Q6NXM2
RefSeq (mRNA)	NM_018191	NM_027764; NM_001360610; NM_001360611
RefSeq (protein)	NP_060661; NP_001339429; NP_001339430; NP_001339431; NP_001339432 NP_001339433; NP_001339434; NP_001339435	NP_082040; NP_001347539; NP_001347540
Location (UCSC)	n/a	Chr 14: 59.44 – 59.47 Mb
PubMed search
- Wikidata
View/Edit Human	View/Edit Mouse

RCC1 and BTB domain-containing protein 1 is a protein that in humans is encoded by the RCBTB1 gene.

This gene encodes a protein with an N-terminal RCC1 domain and a C-terminal BTB (broad complex, tramtrack and bric-a-brac) domain. In rats, over-expression of this gene in vascular smooth muscle cells induced cellular hypertrophy. The C-terminus of RCBTB1 interacts with the angiotensin II receptor-1A. In humans, this gene maps to a region of chromosome 13q that is frequently deleted in B-cell chronic lymphocytic leukemia and other lymphoid malignancies.
