= CCDC70 =

Protein-coding gene in humans

Identifiers
- Aliases: CCDC70, coiled-coil domain containing 70
- External IDs: MGI: 1915179; HomoloGene: 12214; GeneCards: CCDC70; OMA:CCDC70 - orthologs

Gene location (Human)
Chr.	Chromosome 13 (human)
Band	13q14.3	Start	51,861,969 bp
Band	13q14.3	End	51,866,232 bp

Gene location (Mouse)
Chr.	Chromosome 8 (mouse)
Band	8|8 A2	Start	22,459,791 bp
Band	8|8 A2	End	22,464,057 bp
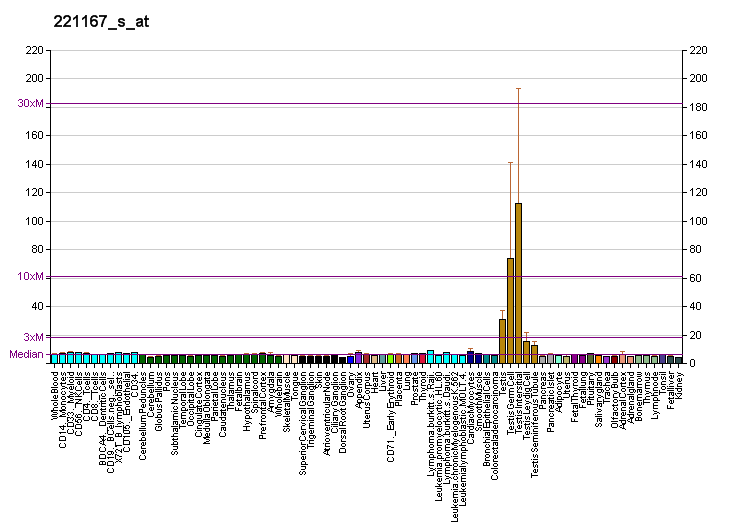
RNA expression pattern
Bgee	Human / Mouse (ortholog); Top expressed in: left testis; right testis; testicle; sperm; right coronary artery; mammary gland; female breast; lactiferous gland; human musculoskeletal system; muscular system / Top expressed in: seminiferous tubule; spermatid; spermatocyte; nucleus of brain; telencephalic nucleus; basal forebrain; diencephalon; pancreas; septal nuclei; gland; More reference expression data
BioGPS	More reference expression data
Orthologs
Species	Human	Mouse
Entrez	83446	67929
Ensembl	ENSG00000123171	ENSMUSG00000017049
UniProt	Q6NSX1	Q9D9B0
RefSeq (mRNA)	NM_031290; NM_001346075	NM_026459; NM_001357224
RefSeq (protein)	NP_001333004; NP_112580	NP_080735; NP_001344153
Location (UCSC)	Chr 13: 51.86 – 51.87 Mb	Chr 8: 22.46 – 22.46 Mb
PubMed search
- Wikidata
View/Edit Human	View/Edit Mouse

Coiled-coil domain-containing protein 70 is a protein that in humans is encoded by the CCDC70 gene.
