= INTS6 =

Protein-coding gene in the species Homo sapiens

Identifiers
- Aliases: INTS6, DBI-1, DDX26, DDX26A, DICE1, HDB, INT6, Notchl2, integrator complex subunit 6
- External IDs: OMIM: 604331; MGI: 1202397; GeneCards: INTS6

Gene location (Human)
Chr.	Chromosome 13 (human)
Band	13q14.3	Start	51,354,077 bp
Band	13q14.3	End	51,454,264 bp

Gene location (Mouse)
Chr.	Chromosome 14 (mouse)
Band	14|14 D1	Start	62,913,779 bp
Band	14|14 D1	End	62,998,618 bp
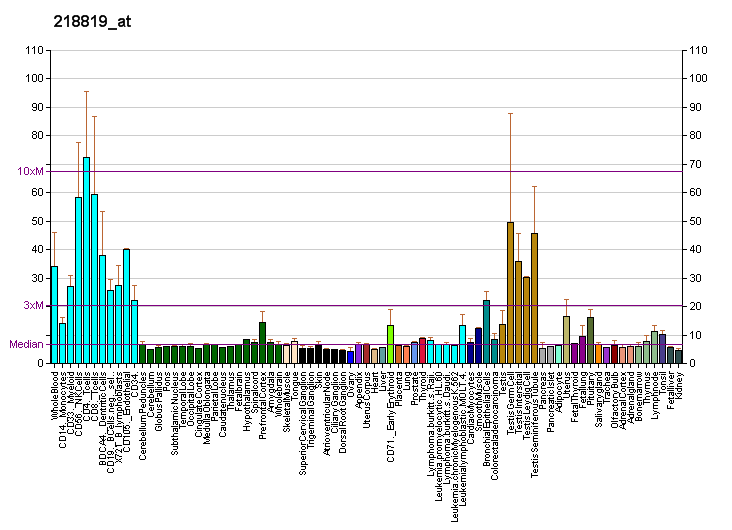

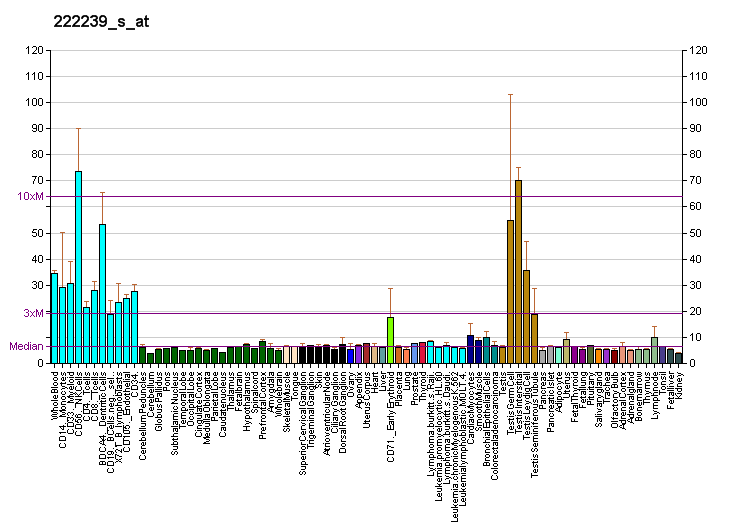
RNA expression pattern
Bgee	Human / Mouse (ortholog); Top expressed in: secondary oocyte; Achilles tendon; optic nerve; right testis; left testis; epithelium of colon; tonsil; body of pancreas; ventricular zone; gingival epithelium / Top expressed in: spermatocyte; spermatid; tail of embryo; seminiferous tubule; Gonadal ridge; lacrimal gland; genital tubercle; human fetus; gastrula; cumulus cell; More reference expression data
BioGPS	More reference expression data
Gene ontology
Molecular function	protein binding; transmembrane signaling receptor activity
Cellular component	integrator complex; actin cytoskeleton; nucleoplasm; nucleus
Biological process	snRNA processing; snRNA transcription by RNA polymerase II; signal transduction; snRNA 3'-end processing
Sources:Amigo / QuickGO
Orthologs
Databases	NCBI: entry; OMA: entry
Species	Human	Mouse
Entrez	26512	18130
Ensembl	ENSG00000102786	ENSMUSG00000035161
UniProt	Q9UL03	Q6PCM2
RefSeq (mRNA)	NM_001039937; NM_001039938; NM_001306091; NM_012141	NM_008715
RefSeq (protein)	NP_001035026; NP_001035027; NP_001293020; NP_036273	NP_032741
Location (UCSC)	Chr 13: 51.35 – 51.45 Mb	Chr 14: 62.91 – 63 Mb
PubMed search
- Wikidata
View/Edit Human	View/Edit Mouse

Integrator complex subunit 6 is a protein that in humans is encoded by the INTS6 gene.

DEAD box proteins, characterized by the conserved motif Asp-Glu-Ala-Asp (DEAD), are putative RNA helicases. The protein encoded by this gene is a DEAD box protein that is part of a complex that interacts with the C-terminus of RNA polymerase II and is involved in 3' end processing of snRNAs. In addition, this gene is a candidate tumor suppressor and located in the critical region of loss of heterozygosity (LOH). Three transcript variants encoding two different isoforms have been found for this gene.
