= MBNL2 =

Protein-coding gene in the species Homo sapiens

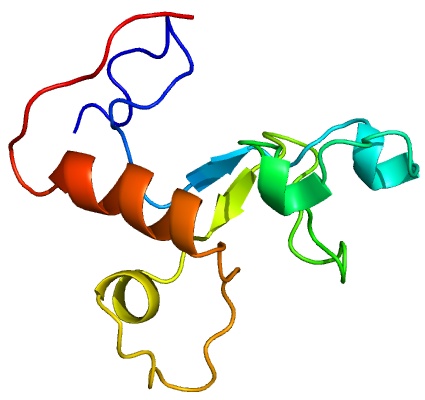

Identifiers
- Aliases: MBNL2, MBLL, MBLL39, PRO2032, muscleblind like splicing regulator 2
- External IDs: OMIM: 607327; MGI: 2145597; GeneCards: MBNL2
Available structures
PDB	Ortholog search: PDBe RCSB
PDB	List of PDB id codes 2E5S, 2RPP

Gene location (Human)
Chr.	Chromosome 13 (human)
Band	13q32.1	Start	97,221,434 bp
Band	13q32.1	End	97,394,120 bp

Gene location (Mouse)
Chr.	Chromosome 14 (mouse)
Band	14|14 E4	Start	120,513,081 bp
Band	14|14 E4	End	120,669,109 bp
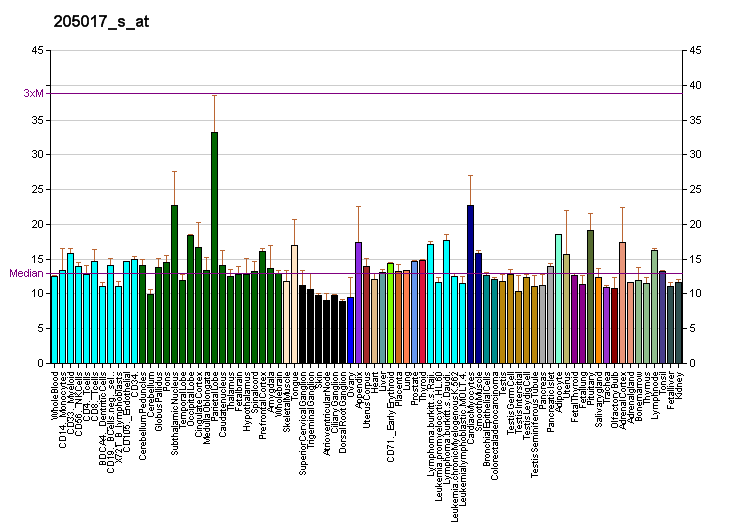

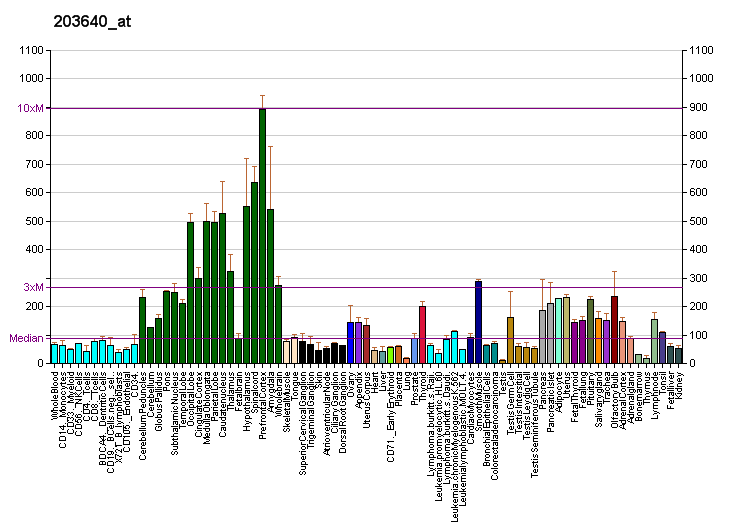

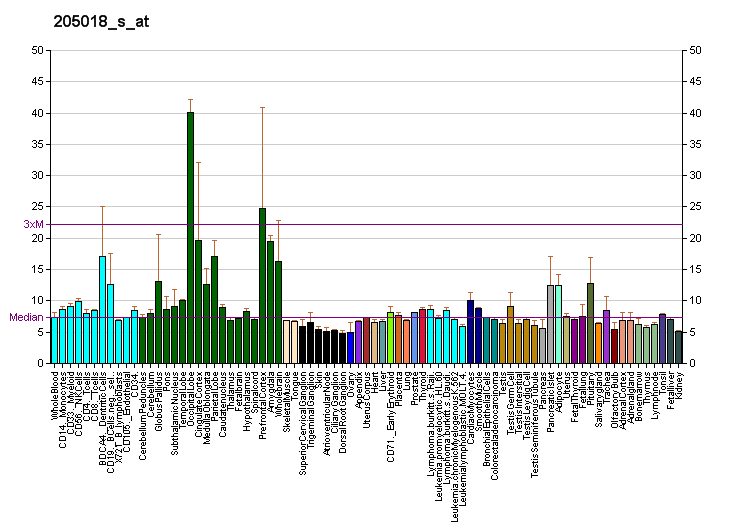
RNA expression pattern
Bgee	Human / Mouse (ortholog); Top expressed in: endothelial cell; external globus pallidus; right ventricle; inferior ganglion of vagus nerve; lateral nuclear group of thalamus; subthalamic nucleus; pars reticulata; pons; pars compacta; optic nerve / Top expressed in: hand; interventricular septum; otolith organ; utricle; mammillary body; lateral septal nucleus; ventromedial nucleus; superior cervical ganglion; olfactory tubercle; foot; More reference expression data
BioGPS	More reference expression data
Gene ontology
Molecular function	metal ion binding; RNA binding
Cellular component	cytoplasm; nucleus; nucleoplasm
Biological process	regulation of RNA splicing; mRNA processing; regulation of alternative mRNA splicing, via spliceosome; RNA splicing
Sources:Amigo / QuickGO
Orthologs
Databases	NCBI: entry; OMA: entry
Species	Human	Mouse
Entrez	10150	105559
Ensembl	ENSG00000139793	ENSMUSG00000022139
UniProt	Q5VZF2	Q8C181
RefSeq (mRNA)	NM_001306070; NM_144778; NM_207304	NM_175341; NM_207515; NM_001360376; NM_001360377; NM_001360378 NM_001360379; NM_001360380
RefSeq (protein)	NP_001292999; NP_659002; NP_997187; NP_001369578; NP_001369579 NP_001369580; NP_001369581; NP_001369582; NP_001369583; NP_001369585; NP_001369589; NP_001369590; NP_001369592; NP_001369595; NP_001369596; NP_001369597; NP_001369598; NP_001369599; NP_001369600; NP_001369601; NP_001369602; NP_001369603; NP_001369604; NP_001369605; NP_001369606; NP_001369607; NP_001369608; NP_001369609; NP_001369610; NP_001369611; NP_001369612; NP_001369613; NP_001369614; NP_001369615; NP_001369616; NP_001369617; NP_001369618; NP_001369619; NP_001369620; NP_001369621; NP_001369622; NP_001369623; NP_001369624; NP_001369625; NP_001369626	NP_780550; NP_997398; NP_001347305; NP_001347306; NP_001347307 NP_001347308; NP_001347309
Location (UCSC)	Chr 13: 97.22 – 97.39 Mb	Chr 14: 120.51 – 120.67 Mb
PubMed search
- Wikidata
View/Edit Human	View/Edit Mouse

Muscleblind-like protein 2 is a protein that in humans is encoded by the MBNL2 gene.

This gene encodes a C3H-type zinc finger protein, which is similar to the Drosophila melanogaster muscleblind B protein. Drosophila muscleblind is a gene required for photoreceptor differentiation. Several alternatively spliced transcript variants have been described but the full-length natures of only some have been determined.
