= SPRYD7 =

Protein-coding gene in the species Homo sapiens

Identifiers
- Aliases: SPRYD7, C13orf1, CLLD6, SPRY domain containing 7
- External IDs: OMIM: 607866; MGI: 1913924; HomoloGene: 10725; GeneCards: SPRYD7; OMA:SPRYD7 - orthologs

Gene location (Human)
Chr.	Chromosome 13 (human)
Band	13q14.2	Start	49,912,702 bp
Band	13q14.2	End	49,936,490 bp

Gene location (Mouse)
Chr.	Chromosome 14 (mouse)
Band	14|14 D1	Start	61,769,442 bp
Band	14|14 D1	End	61,794,335 bp
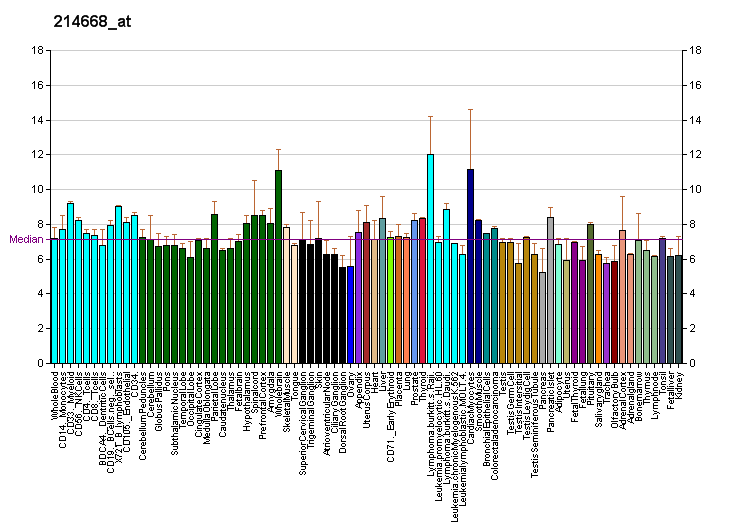
RNA expression pattern
Bgee	Human / Mouse (ortholog); Top expressed in: gastrocnemius muscle; muscle of thigh; gonad; dorsolateral prefrontal cortex; Brodmann area 9; cingulate gyrus; anterior cingulate cortex; endothelial cell; middle temporal gyrus; right frontal lobe / Top expressed in: dorsomedial hypothalamic nucleus; ventral tegmental area; spermatocyte; triceps brachii muscle; habenula; paraventricular nucleus of hypothalamus; temporal muscle; sternocleidomastoid muscle; dorsal tegmental nucleus; lateral septal nucleus; More reference expression data
BioGPS	More reference expression data
Orthologs
Species	Human	Mouse
Entrez	57213	66674
Ensembl	ENSG00000123178	ENSMUSG00000021930
UniProt	Q5W111	Q3TFQ1
RefSeq (mRNA)	NM_001127482; NM_020456	NM_025697; NM_001310603
RefSeq (protein)	NP_001120954; NP_065189	NP_001297532; NP_079973
Location (UCSC)	Chr 13: 49.91 – 49.94 Mb	Chr 14: 61.77 – 61.79 Mb
PubMed search
- Wikidata
View/Edit Human	View/Edit Mouse

SPRY domain-containing protein 7 (SPRYD7) also known as chronic lymphocytic leukemia deletion region gene 6 protein (CLLD6) is a protein that in humans is encoded by the SPRYD7 gene.
