= WBP4 =

Protein-coding gene in the species Homo sapiens

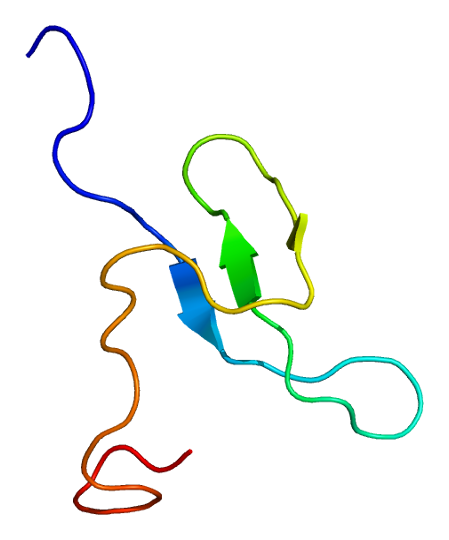

Identifiers
- Aliases: WBP4, FBP21, WW domain binding protein 4
- External IDs: OMIM: 604981; MGI: 109568; GeneCards: WBP4
Available structures
PDB	Ortholog search: PDBe RCSB
PDB	List of PDB id codes 2DK1, 2JXW

Gene location (Human)
Chr.	Chromosome 13 (human)
Band	13q14.11	Start	41,061,509 bp
Band	13q14.11	End	41,084,006 bp

Gene location (Mouse)
Chr.	Chromosome 14 (mouse)
Band	14|14 D3	Start	79,697,377 bp
Band	14|14 D3	End	79,718,960 bp
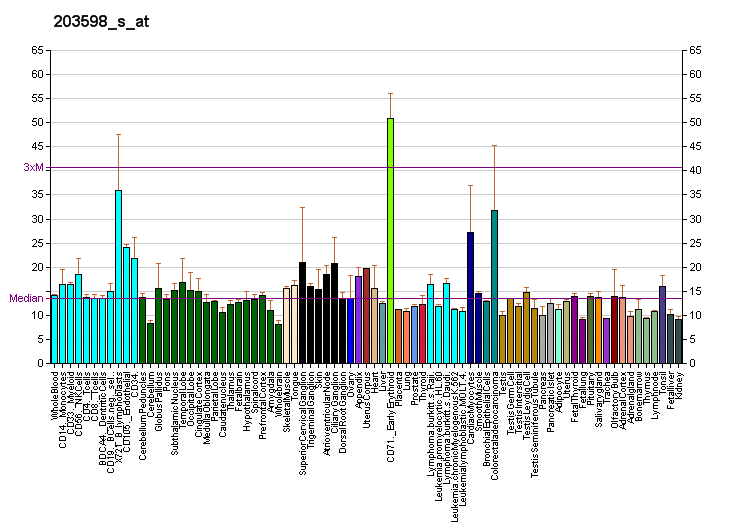

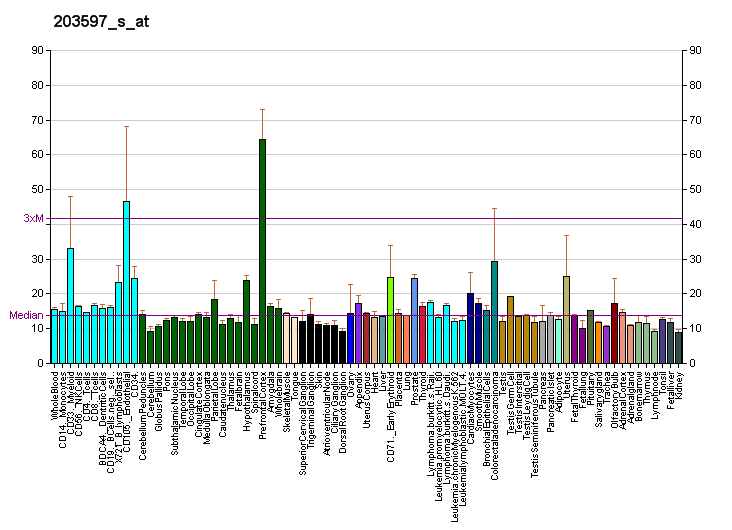

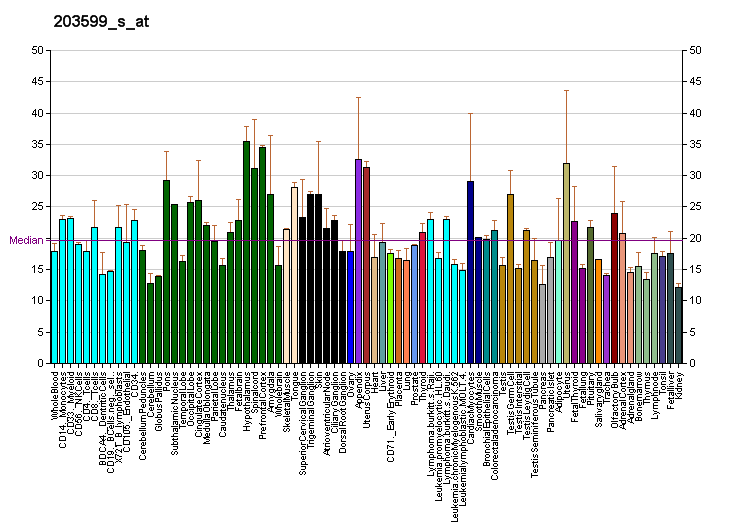
RNA expression pattern
Bgee	Human / Mouse (ortholog); Top expressed in: oocyte; secondary oocyte; amniotic fluid; tendon; biceps brachii; Achilles tendon; Skeletal muscle tissue of biceps brachii; muscle of thigh; gastrocnemius muscle; vastus lateralis muscle / Top expressed in: spermatocyte; Paneth cell; endothelial cell of lymphatic vessel; genital tubercle; primitive streak; tail of embryo; dentate gyrus of hippocampal formation granule cell; epithelium of lens; hair follicle; substantia nigra; More reference expression data
BioGPS	More reference expression data
Gene ontology
Molecular function	zinc ion binding; proline-rich region binding; protein binding; metal ion binding; nucleic acid binding
Cellular component	nuclear speck; spliceosomal complex; nucleoplasm; nucleus; U2-type precatalytic spliceosome
Biological process	mRNA cis splicing, via spliceosome; mRNA processing; RNA splicing; mRNA splicing, via spliceosome
Sources:Amigo / QuickGO
Orthologs
Databases	NCBI: entry; OMA: entry
Species	Human	Mouse
Entrez	11193	22380
Ensembl	ENSG00000120688	ENSMUSG00000022023
UniProt	O75554	Q61048
RefSeq (mRNA)	NM_007187	NM_018765
RefSeq (protein)	NP_009118	NP_061235
Location (UCSC)	Chr 13: 41.06 – 41.08 Mb	Chr 14: 79.7 – 79.72 Mb
PubMed search
- Wikidata
View/Edit Human	View/Edit Mouse

WW domain-binding protein 4 is a protein that in humans is encoded by the WBP4 gene.

This gene encodes WW domain-containing binding protein 4. The WW domain represents a small and compact globular structure that interacts with proline-rich ligands. This encoded protein is a general spliceosomal protein that may play a role in cross-intron bridging of U1 and U2 snRNPs in the spliceosomal complex A.

Bi-allelic variants in WBP4 are responsible of spliceosomopathies leading to developmental disorders. Symptoms include hypotonia, global developmental delay, severe intellectual disability, brain, musculoskeletal, and gastrointestinal abnormalities. Note that mutations on RNU4-2 gene induce also spliceosomopathies leading to intellectual disability.
