= MIRH1 =

MIR17HG

Identifiers
- Aliases: MIR17HG, C13orf25, FGLDS2, LINC00048, MIHG1, MIRH1, MIRHG1, NCRNA00048, miR-17-92, miR-17-92a-1 cluster host gene
- External IDs: OMIM: 609415; GeneCards: MIR17HG; OMA:MIR17HG - orthologs

Gene location (Human)
Chr.	Chromosome 13 (human)
Band	13q31.3	Start	91,347,820 bp
Band	13q31.3	End	91,354,579 bp
RNA expression pattern
Bgee	Human / Mouse (ortholog); Top expressed in: gonad; pancreatic epithelial cell; body of pancreas; testicle; mucosa of transverse colon; sural nerve; left uterine tube; appendix; Achilles tendon; bone marrow cells / n/a; More reference expression data
BioGPS	n/a
Orthologs
Species	Human	Mouse
Entrez	407975	n/a
Ensembl	ENSG00000215417	n/a
UniProt	n a	n/a
RefSeq (mRNA)	NM_213723; NM_213724	n/a
RefSeq (protein)	n/a	n/a
Location (UCSC)	Chr 13: 91.35 – 91.35 Mb	n/a
PubMed search		n/a
- Wikidata
View/Edit Human

Putative microRNA host gene 1 protein is a protein that in humans is encoded by the MIR17HG gene.
