= DZIP1 =

Protein-coding gene in the species Homo sapiens

Identifiers
- Aliases: DZIP1, DZIP, DZIPt1, DAZ interacting zinc finger protein 1, MVP3, SPGF47
- External IDs: OMIM: 608671; MGI: 1914311; GeneCards: DZIP1

Gene location (Human)
Chr.	Chromosome 13 (human)
Band	13q32.1	Start	95,578,202 bp
Band	13q32.1	End	95,644,706 bp

Gene location (Mouse)
Chr.	Chromosome 14 (mouse)
Band	14|14 E4	Start	118,875,520 bp
Band	14|14 E4	End	118,925,460 bp
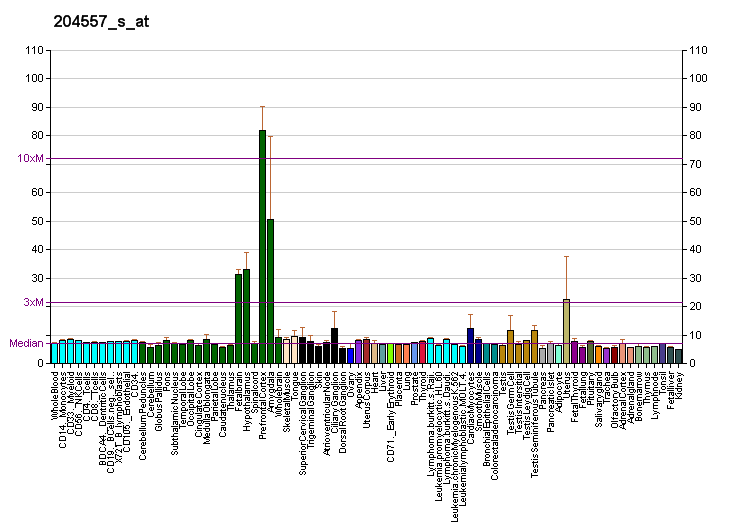

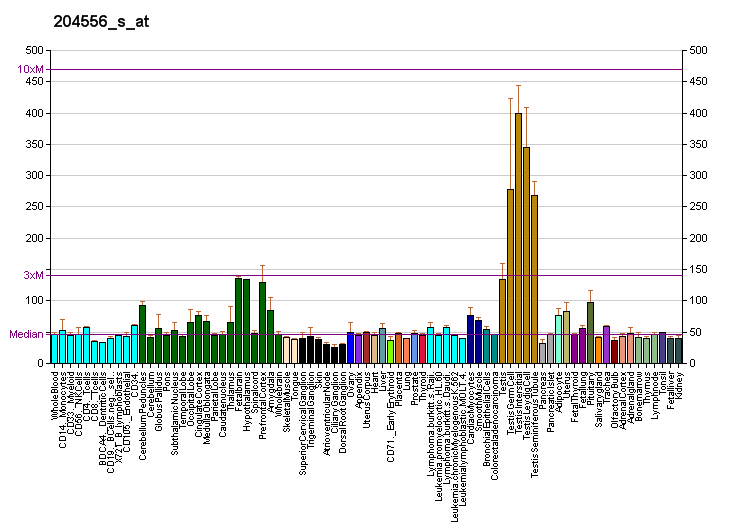
RNA expression pattern
Bgee	Human / Mouse (ortholog); Top expressed in: sperm; left testis; Achilles tendon; right testis; ventricular zone; caput epididymis; right frontal lobe; secondary oocyte; stromal cell of endometrium; cerebellar hemisphere / Top expressed in: dorsomedial hypothalamic nucleus; lateral hypothalamus; spermatid; paraventricular nucleus of hypothalamus; superior colliculus; ventral tegmental area; genital tubercle; dorsal tegmental nucleus; medial vestibular nucleus; central gray substance of midbrain; More reference expression data
BioGPS	More reference expression data
Gene ontology
Molecular function	protein binding; metal ion binding; nucleic acid binding
Cellular component	cytoplasm; ciliary basal body; ciliary transition fiber; centriole; cell projection; cilium; cytoskeleton; nucleus; nucleoplasm; microtubule organizing center; cytosol; protein-containing complex; centriolar satellite
Biological process	multicellular organism development; establishment of protein localization; germ cell development; smoothened signaling pathway; cell differentiation; spermatogenesis; cytoplasmic sequestering of protein; cilium assembly; regulation of protein binding; cilium organization; positive regulation of cilium assembly; protein localization to cilium
Sources:Amigo / QuickGO
Orthologs
Databases	NCBI: entry; OMA: entry
Species	Human	Mouse
Entrez	22873	66573
Ensembl	ENSG00000134874	ENSMUSG00000042156
UniProt	Q86YF9	Q8BMD2
RefSeq (mRNA)	NM_014934; NM_198968	NM_025943; NM_001360411; NM_001360412; NM_001360413
RefSeq (protein)	NP_055749; NP_945319	NP_080219; NP_001347340; NP_001347341; NP_001347342
Location (UCSC)	Chr 13: 95.58 – 95.64 Mb	Chr 14: 118.88 – 118.93 Mb
PubMed search
- Wikidata
View/Edit Human	View/Edit Mouse

Zinc finger protein DZIP1 is a protein that in humans is encoded by the DZIP1 gene.
