= SLITRK5 =

Protein-coding gene in the species Homo sapiens

Identifiers
- Aliases: SLITRK5, LRRC11, bA364G4.2, SLIT and NTRK like family member 5
- External IDs: OMIM: 609680; MGI: 2679448; GeneCards: SLITRK5

Gene location (Human)
Chr.	Chromosome 13 (human)
Band	13q31.2	Start	87,671,371 bp
Band	13q31.2	End	87,696,272 bp

Gene location (Mouse)
Chr.	Chromosome 14 (mouse)
Band	14|14 E4	Start	111,912,529 bp
Band	14|14 E4	End	111,920,573 bp
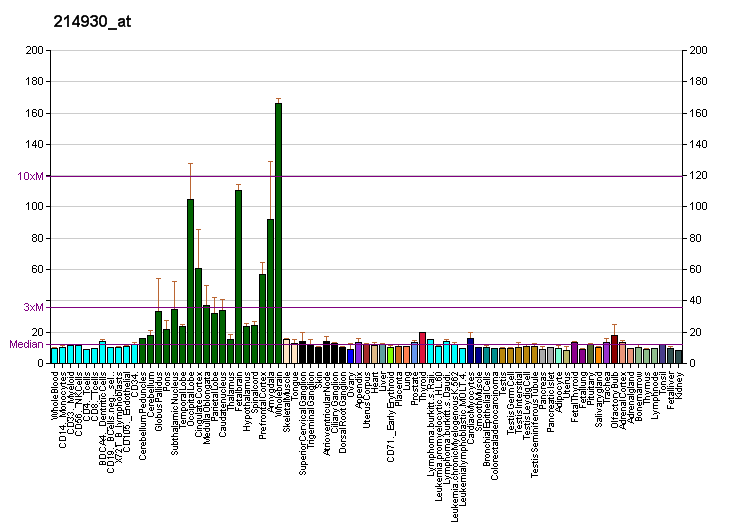
RNA expression pattern
Bgee	Human / Mouse (ortholog); Top expressed in: middle temporal gyrus; frontal pole; Brodmann area 23; parotid gland; Brodmann area 10; orbitofrontal cortex; Brodmann area 46; postcentral gyrus; superior frontal gyrus; Region I of hippocampus proper / Top expressed in: subiculum; primary motor cortex; anterior amygdaloid area; ventromedial nucleus; piriform cortex; mammillary body; cingulate gyrus; facial motor nucleus; superior colliculus; olfactory tubercle; More reference expression data
BioGPS	More reference expression data
Orthologs
Databases	NCBI: entry; OMA: entry
Species	Human	Mouse
Entrez	26050	75409
Ensembl	ENSG00000165300	ENSMUSG00000033214
UniProt	O94991	Q810B7
RefSeq (mRNA)	NM_015567; NM_001384609; NM_001384610	NM_029273; NM_198865; NM_001378768; NM_001378769; NM_001378770
RefSeq (protein)	NP_056382	NP_942565; NP_001365697; NP_001365698; NP_001365699
Location (UCSC)	Chr 13: 87.67 – 87.7 Mb	Chr 14: 111.91 – 111.92 Mb
PubMed search
- Wikidata
View/Edit Human	View/Edit Mouse

SLIT and NTRK-like protein 5 is a protein that in humans is encoded by the SLITRK5 gene.

== Function ==
Members of the SLITRK family, such as SLITRK5, are integral membrane proteins with 2 N-terminal leucine-rich repeat (LRR) domains similar to those of SLIT proteins (see SLIT1; MIM 603742). Most SLITRKs, including SLITRK5, also have C-terminal regions that share homology with neurotrophin receptors (see NTRK1; MIM 191315). SLITRKs are expressed predominantly in neural tissues and have neurite-modulating activity (Aruga et al., 2003).[supplied by OMIM]
