= Long intergenic non-protein coding RNA 598 =

LINC00598

Identifiers
- Aliases: LINC00598, TTL, long intergenic non-protein coding RNA 598, lncFOXO1
- External IDs: GeneCards: LINC00598

Gene location (Human)
Chr.	Chromosome 13 (human)
Band	13q14.11	Start	40,079,106 bp
Band	13q14.11	End	40,535,807 bp
RNA expression pattern
Bgee	Human / Mouse (ortholog); Top expressed in: buccal mucosa cell; gonad; epithelium of colon; sural nerve; testicle; Achilles tendon; anterior pituitary; monocyte; right ovary; right lobe of liver / n/a; More reference expression data
BioGPS	n/a
Orthologs
Databases	NCBI: entry; OMA: entry
Species	Human	Mouse
Entrez	646982	n/a
Ensembl	ENSG00000215483	n/a
UniProt	n a	n/a
RefSeq (mRNA)	n/a	n/a
RefSeq (protein)	n/a	n/a
Location (UCSC)	Chr 13: 40.08 – 40.54 Mb	n/a
PubMed search		n/a
- Wikidata
View/Edit Human

Long intergenic non-protein coding RNA 598 is an lncRNA that in humans is encoded by the LINC00598 gene.
