= CRYL1 =

Protein-coding gene in the species Homo sapiens

Identifiers
- Aliases: CRYL1, GDH, HEL30, lambda-CRY, crystallin lambda 1, gul3DH, Crystallin, lambda 1
- External IDs: OMIM: 609877; MGI: 1915881; GeneCards: CRYL1
Available structures
PDB	Ortholog search: PDBe RCSB
PDB	List of PDB id codes 3F3S
Enzyme activity
EC #	BRENDA	ExPASy	KEGG	MetaCyc
1.1.1.45	↗	↗	↗	↗

Gene location (Human)
Chr.	Chromosome 13 (human)
Band	13q12.11	Start	20,403,666 bp
Band	13q12.11	End	20,525,873 bp

Gene location (Mouse)
Chr.	Chromosome 14 (mouse)
Band	14 C3|14 30.1 cM	Start	57,512,450 bp
Band	14 C3|14 30.1 cM	End	57,635,986 bp
RNA expression pattern
Bgee	Human / Mouse (ortholog); Top expressed in: right lobe of liver; human kidney; C1 segment; renal medulla; kidney tubule; duodenum; mucosa of transverse colon; jejunal mucosa; nucleus accumbens; caudate nucleus / Top expressed in: right kidney; human kidney; proximal tubule; duodenum; jejunum; epithelium of small intestine; nasal epithelium; olfactory epithelium; ileum; colon; More reference expression data
BioGPS	n/a
Gene ontology
Molecular function	oxidoreductase activity; L-gulonate 3-dehydrogenase activity; protein homodimerization activity; NAD+ binding; 3-hydroxyacyl-CoA dehydrogenase activity
Cellular component	cytosol; extracellular exosome; cytoplasm
Biological process	glucuronate catabolic process to xylulose 5-phosphate; fatty acid metabolic process
Sources:Amigo / QuickGO
Orthologs
Databases	NCBI: entry; OMA: entry
Species	Human	Mouse
Entrez	51084	68631
Ensembl	ENSG00000165475	ENSMUSG00000021947
UniProt	Q9Y2S2	Q99KP3
RefSeq (mRNA)	NM_015974; NM_001363647	NM_030004
RefSeq (protein)	NP_057058; NP_001350576	NP_084280
Location (UCSC)	Chr 13: 20.4 – 20.53 Mb	Chr 14: 57.51 – 57.64 Mb
PubMed search
- Wikidata
View/Edit Human	View/Edit Mouse

Crystallin, lambda 1 is a protein that in humans is encoded by the CRYL1 gene.
