= Microtubule associated scaffold protein 2 =

Protein-coding gene in the species Homo sapiens

MTUS2

Identifiers
- Aliases: MTUS2, CAZIP, ICIS, KIAA0774, TIP150, microtubule associated tumor suppressor candidate 2, microtubule associated scaffold protein 2
- External IDs: MGI: 1915388; HomoloGene: 78141; GeneCards: MTUS2; OMA:MTUS2 - orthologs

Gene location (Human)
Chr.	Chromosome 13 (human)
Band	13q12.3	Start	28,820,339 bp
Band	13q12.3	End	29,505,947 bp

Gene location (Mouse)
Chr.	Chromosome 5 (mouse)
Band	5|5 G3	Start	147,894,130 bp
Band	5|5 G3	End	148,252,875 bp
RNA expression pattern
Bgee	Human / Mouse (ortholog); Top expressed in: right ventricle; myocardium of left ventricle; apex of heart; cardiac muscle tissue of right atrium; right auricle of heart; Brodmann area 23; ascending aorta; primary visual cortex; Descending thoracic aorta; gonad / Top expressed in: interventricular septum; zygote; right ventricle; primary oocyte; secondary oocyte; myocardium of ventricle; autonomic nerve plexus; left ventricle; otolith organ; utricle; More reference expression data
BioGPS	n/a
Orthologs
Species	Human	Mouse
Entrez	23281	77521
Ensembl	ENSG00000132938	ENSMUSG00000029651
UniProt	Q5JR59	Q3UHD3
RefSeq (mRNA)	NM_001033602; NM_015233; NM_001366650; NM_001366651; NM_001384605 NM_001384606	NM_029920; NM_001359503; NM_001359505; NM_001359511
RefSeq (protein)	NP_001028774; NP_056048; NP_001353579; NP_001353580	NP_084196; NP_001346432; NP_001346434; NP_001346440
Location (UCSC)	Chr 13: 28.82 – 29.51 Mb	Chr 5: 147.89 – 148.25 Mb
PubMed search
- Wikidata
View/Edit Human	View/Edit Mouse

Microtubule associated scaffold protein 2 is a protein that in humans is encoded by the MTUS2 gene.
