= SCEL (gene) =

Protein-coding gene in the species Homo sapiens

Identifiers
- Aliases: SCEL, sciellin
- External IDs: OMIM: 604112; MGI: 1891228; GeneCards: SCEL

Gene location (Human)
Chr.	Chromosome 13 (human)
Band	13q22.3	Start	77,535,674 bp
Band	13q22.3	End	77,645,263 bp

Gene location (Mouse)
Chr.	Chromosome 14 (mouse)
Band	14|14 E2.3	Start	103,750,778 bp
Band	14|14 E2.3	End	103,850,233 bp
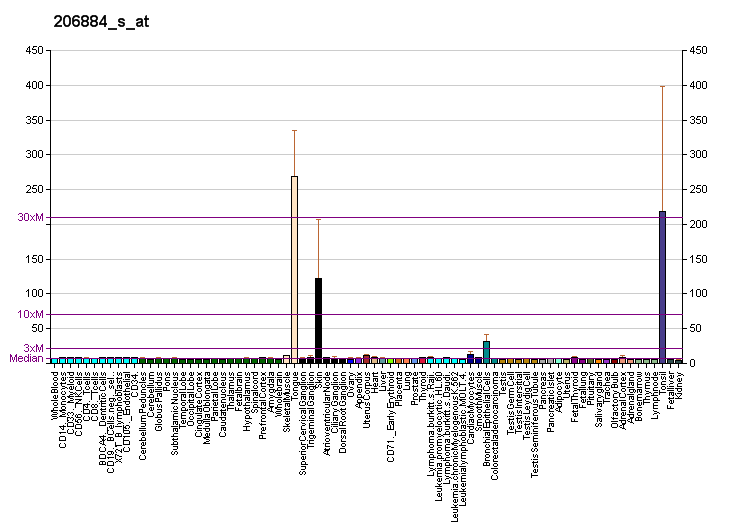
RNA expression pattern
Bgee	Human / Mouse (ortholog); Top expressed in: skin of thigh; oral cavity; skin of arm; mucosa of pharynx; skin of hip; skin of abdomen; buccal mucosa cell; amniotic fluid; gums; human penis / Top expressed in: conjunctival fornix; skin of external ear; corneal stroma; esophagus; hair follicle; skin of back; skin of abdomen; epithelium of lens; right lung; lip; More reference expression data
BioGPS	More reference expression data
Gene ontology
Molecular function	protein binding; metal ion binding
Cellular component	cytoplasm; extracellular exosome; membrane; cornified envelope; perinuclear region of cytoplasm
Biological process	embryo development; epidermis development; keratinocyte differentiation; response to mechanical stimulus; positive regulation of canonical Wnt signaling pathway; embryo development ending in birth or egg hatching
Sources:Amigo / QuickGO
Orthologs
Databases	NCBI: entry; OMA: entry
Species	Human	Mouse
Entrez	8796	64929
Ensembl	ENSG00000136155	ENSMUSG00000022123
UniProt	O95171	Q9EQG3
RefSeq (mRNA)	NM_001160706; NM_003843; NM_144777	NM_022886
RefSeq (protein)	NP_001154178; NP_003834; NP_659001	NP_075024
Location (UCSC)	Chr 13: 77.54 – 77.65 Mb	Chr 14: 103.75 – 103.85 Mb
PubMed search
- Wikidata
View/Edit Human	View/Edit Mouse

Sciellin is a protein that in humans is encoded by the SCEL gene.

The protein encoded by this gene is a precursor to the cornified envelope of terminally differentiated keratinocytes. This protein localizes to the periphery of cells and may function in the assembly or regulation of proteins in the cornified envelope. Transcript variants encoding different isoforms exist. A transcript variant utilizing an alternative polyA signal has been described in the literature, but its full-length nature has not been determined.
