= L1TD1P1 =

Pseudogene in the species Homo sapiens

Identifiers
- Aliases: L1TD1P1, LINE-1 type transposase domain containing 1 pseudogene 1
- External IDs: GeneCards: L1TD1P1; OMA:L1TD1P1 - orthologs
Orthologs
| Species | Human | Mouse |
| Entrez | 100126007 | n/a |
| Ensembl | n/a | n/a |
| UniProt | n a | n/a |
| RefSeq (mRNA) | n/a | n/a |
| RefSeq (protein) | n/a | n/a |
| Location (UCSC) | n/a | n/a |
| PubMed search | | n/a |
- Wikidata
| View/Edit Human |

LINE-1 type transposase domain containing 1 pseudogene 1 is a protein that in humans is encoded by the L1TD1P1 gene.
