= Methylcytosine dioxygenase TET1-like =

Pseudogene in the species Homo sapiens

LOC107984557

Identifiers
- Aliases: methylcytosine dioxygenase TET1-like
- External IDs: GeneCards: ; OMA:- orthologs
Orthologs
Species	Human	Mouse
Entrez	107984557	n/a
Ensembl	n/a	n/a
UniProt	n a	n/a
RefSeq (mRNA)	n/a	n/a
RefSeq (protein)	n/a	n/a
Location (UCSC)	n/a	n/a
PubMed search		n/a
- Wikidata
View/Edit Human

Methylcytosine dioxygenase TET1-like is a protein that in humans is encoded by the LOC107984557 gene.

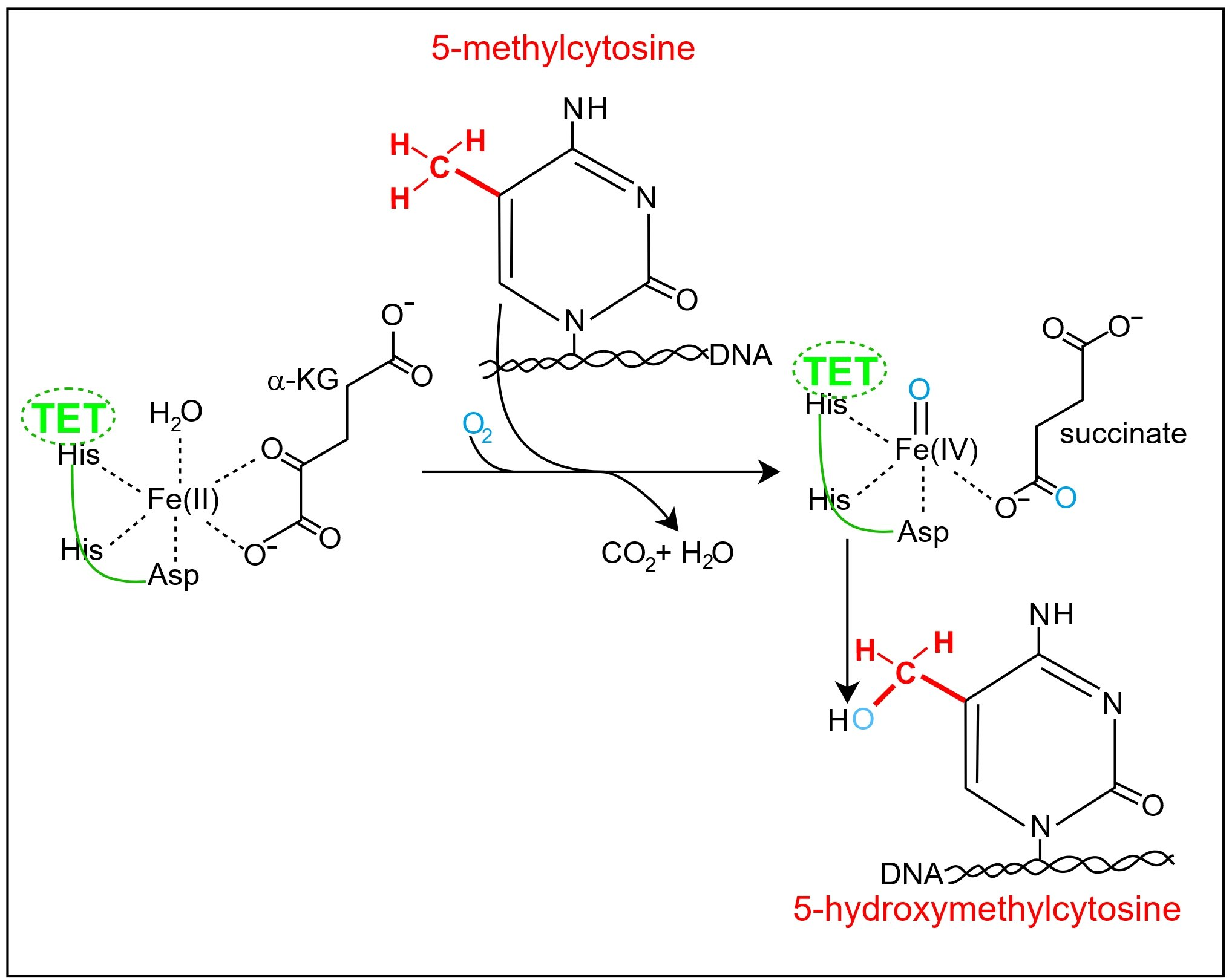
Conversion of 5-methylcytosine to 5-hydroxymetnylcytosine by TET enzyme plus alpha-ketoglutarate
