= SPT20 =

Yeast transcription coregulator

SAGA complex subunit SPT20
- Diagram of transcription factors

Identifiers
- Organism: Saccharomyces cerevisiae (Baker's yeast)
- Symbol: SPT20
- Alt. symbols: ADA5
- Entrez: 854017
- Orthologs: NCBI: entry; OMA: entry
- PDB: 6T9I, 6T9J, 6T9K
- RefSeq (mRNA): NM_001183402
- RefSeq (Prot): NP_014493
- UniProt: P50875

Other data
- Chromosome: XV: 0.05 - 0.05 Mb
Search for
- Structures: Swiss-model
- Domains: InterPro

SAGA complex subunit SPT20 is a regulator of transcription found in yeast. It can recruit TATA binding protein (TBP) and possible other base factors to bind to TATA box. The model of its action by example Saccharomyces cerevisiae was studied. It functions as a component of the transcriptional regulatory complex histone-acetylation a (HAT) SAGA, SALSA and FIG. SAGA is involved in the regulation of transcription-dependent RNA polymerase II about 10% of the yeast gene. In promoter, SAGA is required to engage basal transcription mechanisms. Affects RNA polymerase II transcription activity through various activities, such as TBP interaction (SPT3, SPT8 and SPT20) and promoter selectivity, interaction with transcription activators (GCN5, ADA2, ADA3 and TRA1) and modification chromatin by histone acetylation (GCN5) and ubiquitin deacetylation (UBP8). SAGA acetylates nucleosome or histone H3 to some extent (to form H3K9ac, H3K14ac, H3K18ac, and H3K23ac).

SAGA interacts with DNA via upstream activation sequences (UAS). SALSA, an altered form of SAGA, may be involved in positive regulation transcription. It is suggested that SLIK has partially overlapping functions with SAGA. Preferably acetylation methylated histone H3, at least after activation at the GAL1-10 locus. "ADA5 / SPT20 links the ADA and SPT genes, which are involved in the transcription of yeast".
