= RNA28S1 =

Ribosomal RNA in the species Homo sapiens

Identifiers
- Aliases: RNA28S1, RNA, 28S ribosomal 1
- External IDs: GeneCards: RNA28S1; OMA:RNA28S1 - orthologs
Orthologs
Species	Human	Mouse
Entrez	106632267	n/a
Ensembl	n/a	n/a
UniProt	n a	n/a
RefSeq (mRNA)	n/a	n/a
RefSeq (protein)	n/a	n/a
Location (UCSC)	n/a	n/a
PubMed search		n/a
- Wikidata
View/Edit Human

RNA, 28S ribosomal 1 is a protein that in humans is encoded by the RNA28S1 gene.
