= Mucinous nevus =

- Other names: Nevus mucinosus
- Specialty: Dermatology

Mucinous nevus is a rare cutaneous condition characterized by hamartoma that can be congenital or acquired. Mucinous nevus presents as multiple skin-coloured or brown asymptomatic papules or plaques. Mucinous nevus is diagnosed based on histological features. Treatment is not needed.

== Signs and symptoms ==
Mucinous nevus appears as several skin-coloured to brownish papules or plaques that are asymptomatic; the individual lesions merge and expand to form a unilateral or zosteriform feature that is verrucous or nevoid. It normally starts to develop in early adulthood or from birth. The main location is the trunk, which includes the back.

== Causes ==
There has been reports of familial mucinous nevus, however there have been no reports of genetic abnormalities.

== Diagnosis ==
Histologically, diffuse band-like mucin deposits in the uppermost layer of the dermis are indicative of mucinous nevus. Hyaluronic acid is assumed to be the component of mucin since it reacts positively with alcian blue at pH 2.5 but does not at pH 0.5.

== Treatment ==
Mucinous nevi are benign and don't need to be treated other than for aesthetic reasons. Carbon dioxide laser therapy, scalpel dermabrasion, and surgical excision are treatment options.

== See also ==
- MRI burn
- List of cutaneous conditions
