= Ectomesenchymal chondromyxoid tumor =

Ectomesenchymal chondromyxoid tumor (ECT) is a benign intraoral tumor with presumed origin from undifferentiated (ecto)mesenchymal cells. There are some who think it is a myoepithelial tumor type.

== Controversies about origin ==
- Derived from ectomesenchymal cells migrating from neural crest (there is immunophenotypic support for this theory).
- Equivalent to soft tissue myoepithelioma. There is morphologic and immunohistochemical support for this theory, with some authors advocating interchangeable terms.

== Signs and symptoms ==
Patients present with a painless, slow-growing mass usually within the tongue (most commonly the anterior dorsal tongue). There is an intact surface epithelium.

== Management ==
- Surgical excision is the treatment of choice, with recurrences only when there is incomplete excision.

== Pathology findings ==
=== Macroscopic ===
- Submucosal circumscribed but not encapsulated nodular mass, often with entrapped muscle bundles at the edge. It may have a gelatinous appearance. Most tumors are small, up to 2 cm (given the confines of the tongue, a larger mass would cause significant clinical problems).
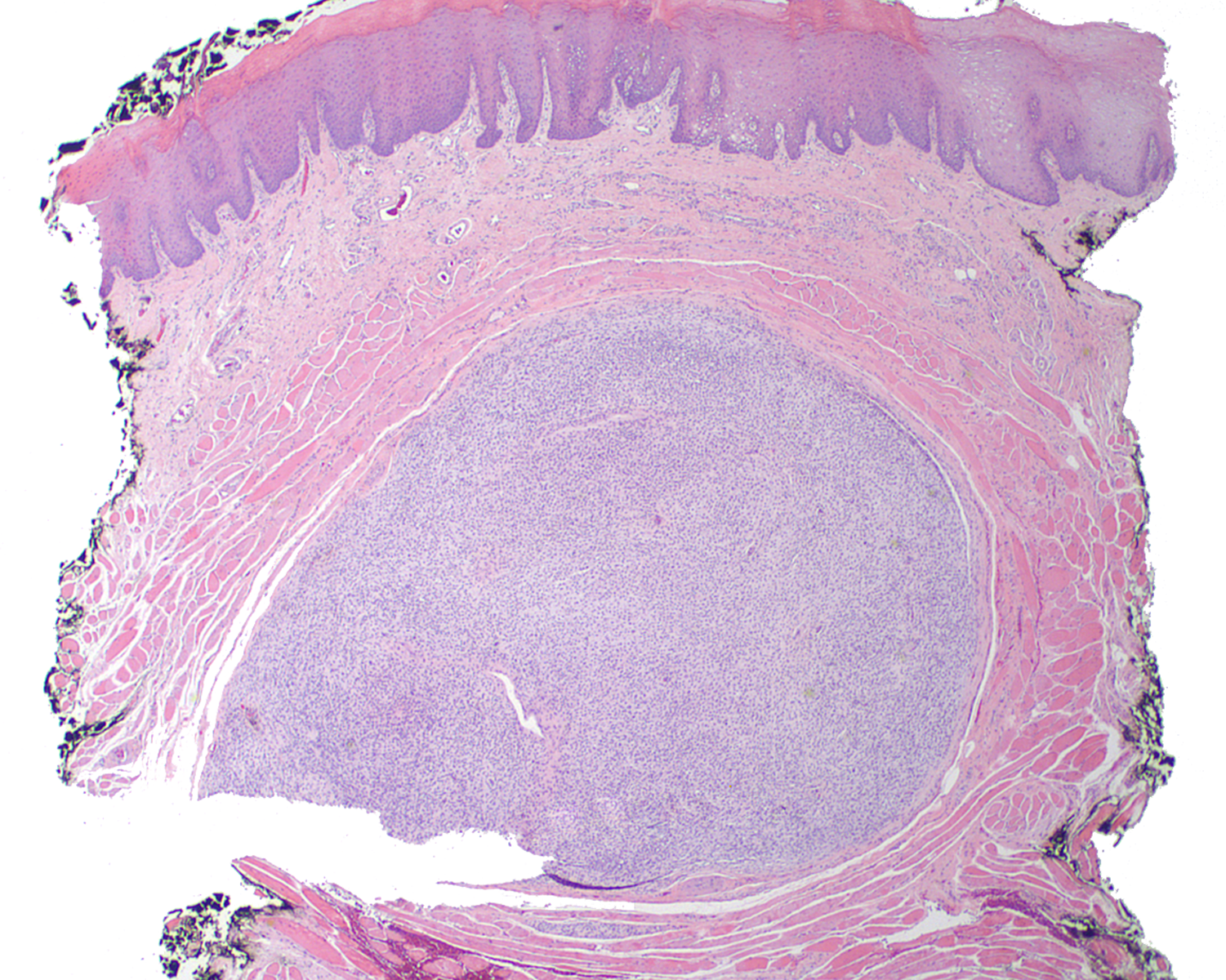
  A very low power hematoxylin and eosin stained slide of an ectomesenchymal chondromyxoid tumor. Note the well demarcated tumor, separate from the overlying, intact squamous mucosa.

=== Microscopic Pathology ===
- Submucosal unencapsulated but well-delineated or circumscribed nodule, often separated from the periphery and internally by fibrous connective tissue bands. The cells are arranged in cords, nests, and net-like sheets.
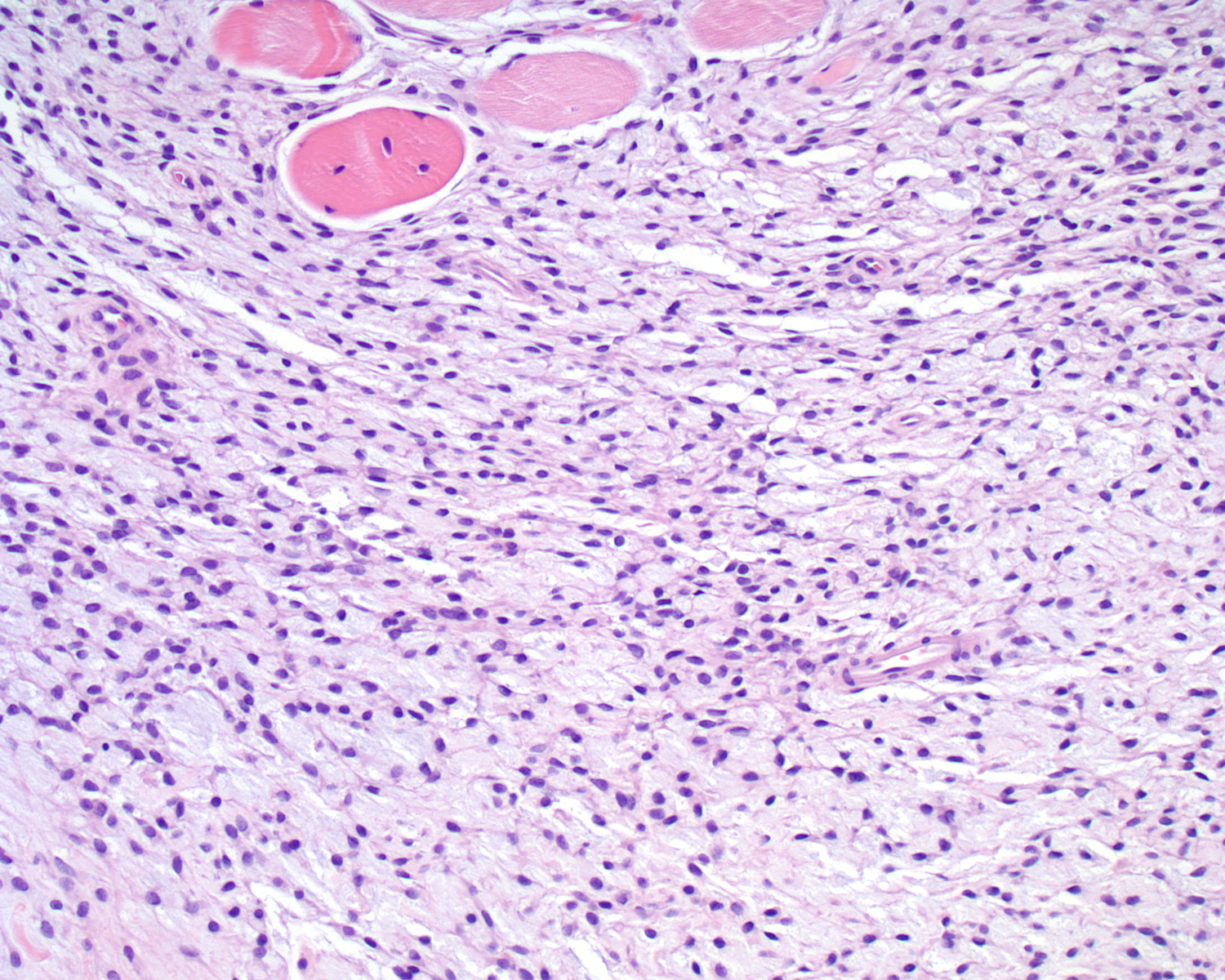
  An intermediate power hematoxylin and eosin stained section of an ectomesenchymal chondromyxoid tumor, showing skeletal muscle entrapment. Note the "net-like" appearance (lower portion).
  The cells may extend into and entrap soft tissue structures including skeletal muscle and nerve bundles.
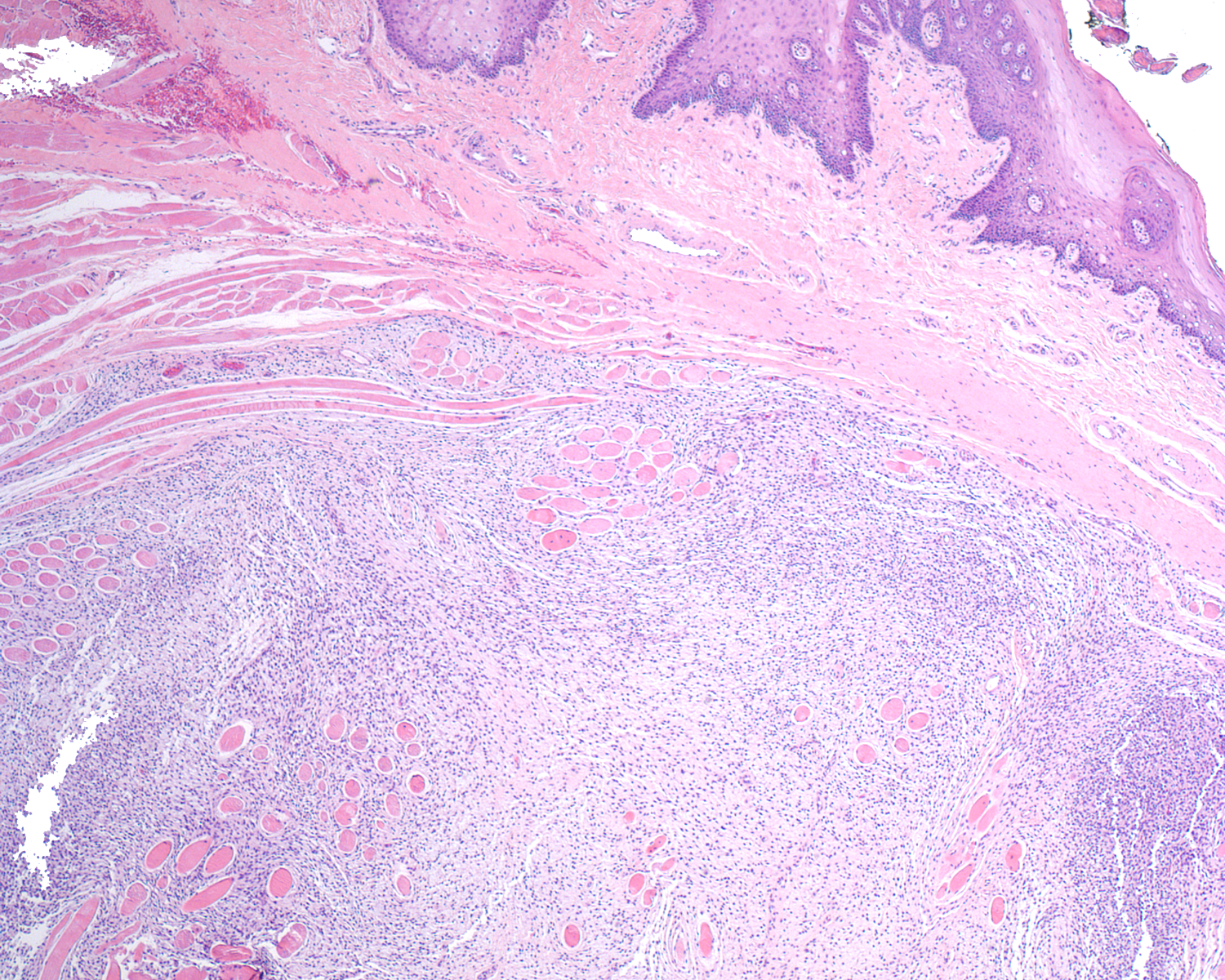
  The overlying surface epithelium is intact and unconnected to the well circumscribed, but unencapsulated ectomesenchymal chondromyxoid tumor of the tongue. There are numerous skeletal muscle bundles at the periphery of the tumor.
- The tumor is made up of small round, oval, spindle, or stellate cells that have a very monotonous appearance. There are small dark nuclei with variably amounts of light to basophilic cytoplasm.
- Nuclear pleomorphism, multinucleation, and mitotic figures are usually not seen. Atypical mitoses and necrosis is absent.
- There is a background stroma composed of chondromyxoid to myxoid material. Sometimes large cells are seen in chondroid or cartilaginous areas. Swirling formations give the appearance of neural tissue.
- Importantly, there is an absence of glands or myoepithelial components.

=== Immunohistochemistry ===
- Positive: Glial fibrillary acidic protein (GFAP), pancytokeratin, and S100 protein. Smooth muscle actin may be positive in about 50% of cases.
- Negative: Epithelial membrane antigen, desmin, p63 and calponin.

=== Ancillary Studies ===
- Alcian blue will give a blue staining to the stromal matrix material.
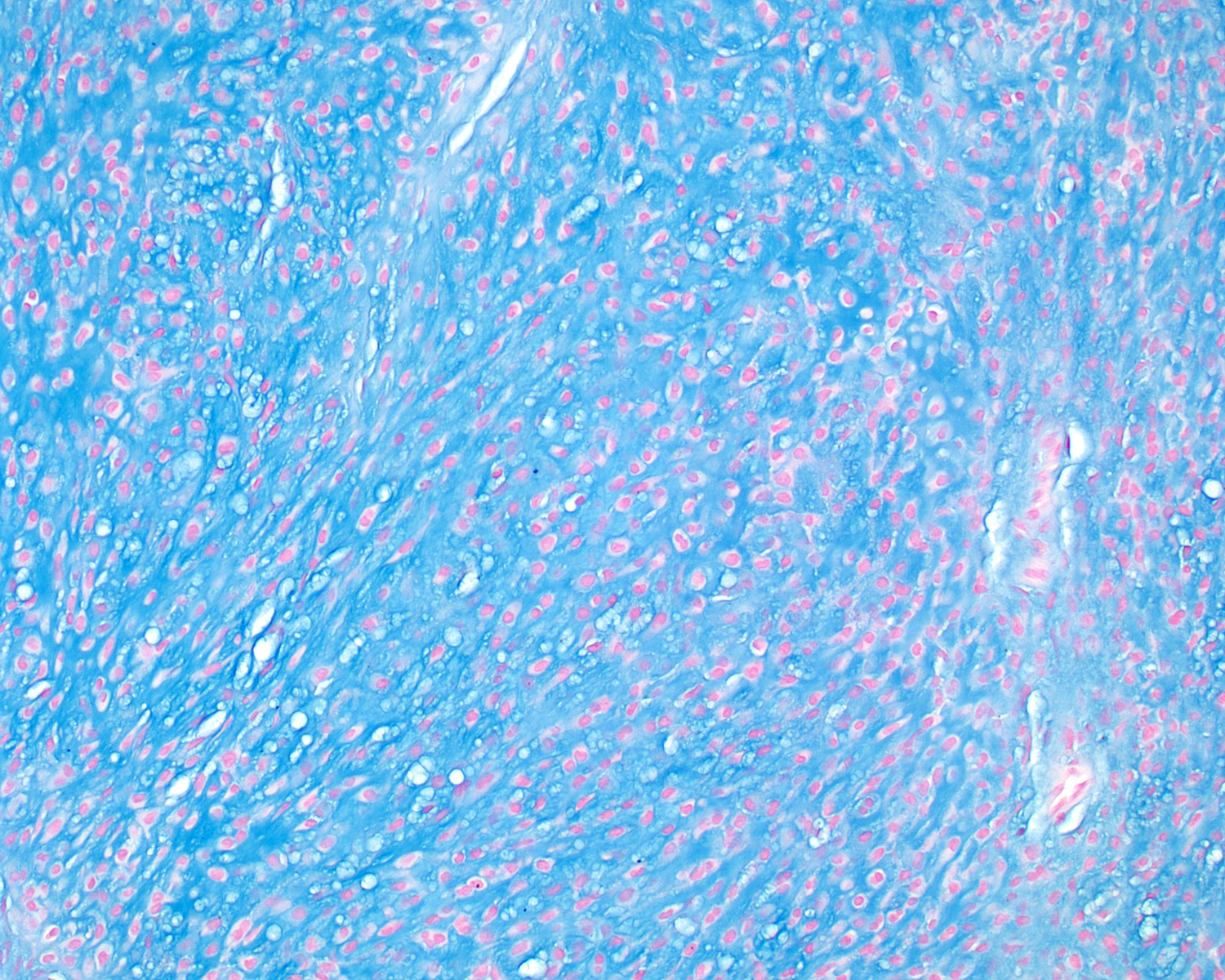
  Alcian blue (pH at 2.5) stains the myxoid background material brightly blue in this ectomesenchymal chondromyxoid tumor of the tongue.
- Mucicarmine will also highlight the stromal matrix (pink).
- There is a specific recurrent RREB1-MKL2 gene fusion present in these tumors.

=== Differential diagnoses ===
The tumor is quite unique, but other tumors are considered in the differential diagnosis histologically. They included pleomorphic adenoma, myoepithelioma, myxoid neurofibroma, neurothekeoma (nerve sheath myxoma), chondroid choristoma, extraskeletal myxoid chondrosarcoma, focal oral mucinosis, and an ossifying fibromyxoid tumor of soft parts.

== Epidemiology ==
Exceedingly rare, this tumor develops in a wide age range, although often in young patients without a sex predilection. The vast majority develop within the anterior dorsal tongue, with palate and base of tongue rarely affected.
