= Alcian yellow =

Names
- IUPAC name {(E)-1,2-Diazenediylbis[4,1-phenylene(6-methyl-1,3-benzothiazole-2,5-diyl)methylenesulfanediyl]}bis[(dimethylamino)-N,N-dimethylmethaniminium]
- Other names Ingrain Yellow 1

Identifiers
CAS Number	61968-76-1
3D model (JSmol)	Interactive image
ChEBI	CHEBI:87352
ChemSpider	2342179
ECHA InfoCard	100.115.894
PubChem CID	3085232
- InChI: InChI=1S/C40H46N8S4/c1-25-19-35-33(21-29(25)23-49-39(45(3)4)46(5)6)41-37(51-35)27-11-15-31(16-12-27)43-44-32-17-13-28(14-18-32)38-42-34-22-30(26(2)20-36(34)52-38)24-50-40(47(7)8)48(9)10/h11-22H,23-24H2,1-10H3/q+2/b44-43+ Key: QMKQNEXRGZFFKQ-VGFSZAGXSA-N; InChI=1/C40H46N8S4/c1-25-19-35-33(21-29(25)23-49-39(45(3)4)46(5)6)41-37(51-35)27-11-15-31(16-12-27)43-44-32-17-13-28(14-18-32)38-42-34-22-30(26(2)20-36(34)52-38)24-50-40(47(7)8)48(9)10/h11-22H,23-24H2,1-10H3/q+2/b44-43+ Key: QMKQNEXRGZFFKQ-VGFSZAGXBQ
- SMILES: Cc1cc2c(cc1CSC(=[N+](C)C)N(C)C)nc(s2)c3ccc(cc3)/N=N/c4ccc(cc4)c5nc6cc(c(cc6s5)C)CSC(=[N+](C)C)N(C)C

Properties
Chemical formula	C_{40}H_{46}N_{8}S_{4}
Molar mass	767.11 g/mol
- Except where otherwise noted, data are given for materials in their standard state (at 25 °C [77 °F], 100 kPa). Infobox references

Alcian yellow is an azo dye with the formula (CH_{3}[(CH_{3}N)_{2}CS]_{2}C_{6}H_{2}SNCC_{6}H_{4})_{2}N_{2}. Its structure consists of a largely conjugated array of benzene, benzothiazole and isothiouronium units.

== Histological Use ==
Alcian yellow is used in histology in conjunction with toluidine blue to help visualize H. pylori. The resulting structures are stained as follows:

– Mucin: yellow

– H. pylori: blue

– Other cellular components/background: shades of blue

== See also ==
- Alcian blue stain
- Direct Yellow 4
