= 2-Hydroxy-4,5-methylenedioxymethamphetamine =

6-Hydroxy-MDMA

Clinical data
- Other names: 6-MDMOH; 6-OH MDMA; 6-Hydroxy-MDMA; 6-Hydroxy-3,4-methylendioxymethamphetamine
- ATC code: none

Identifiers
- IUPAC name: 6-[2-(Methylamino)propyl]-2H-1,3-benzodioxol-5-ol
- CAS Number: 138808-79-4
- PubChem CID: 126235
- ChemSpider: 112206
- CompTox Dashboard (EPA): DTXSID10929516

Chemical and physical data
- Formula: C_{11}H_{15}NO_{3}
- Molar mass: 209.245 g·mol^{−1}
- 3D model (JSmol): Interactive image
- SMILES: CC(CC1=CC2=C(C=C1O)OCO2)NC
- InChI: InChI=1S/C11H15NO3/c1-7(12-2)3-8-4-10-11(5-9(8)13)15-6-14-10/h4-5,7,12-13H,3,6H2,1-2H3; Key:RQQIIXFYTHWFKW-UHFFFAOYSA-N

2-Hydroxy-4,5-methylenedioxymethamphetamine (6-hydroxy-3,4-methylendioxymethamphetamine) It is a non-neurotoxic metabolite of the drug 3,4-methylenedioxymethamphetamine, structurally related to 2-hydroxy-4,5-methylenedioxyamphetamine; it is detected in the brains and plasma of rats but not in their urine. It did not alter the levels of norepinephrine, glutathione, glial fibrillary acidic protein, or serotonin.
