= GFAP =

GFAP may refer to:

- Glial fibrillary acidic protein
- General Framework Agreement for Peace in Bosnia and Herzegovina, also known as the Dayton Agreement
