= Myoepithelioma of the head and neck =

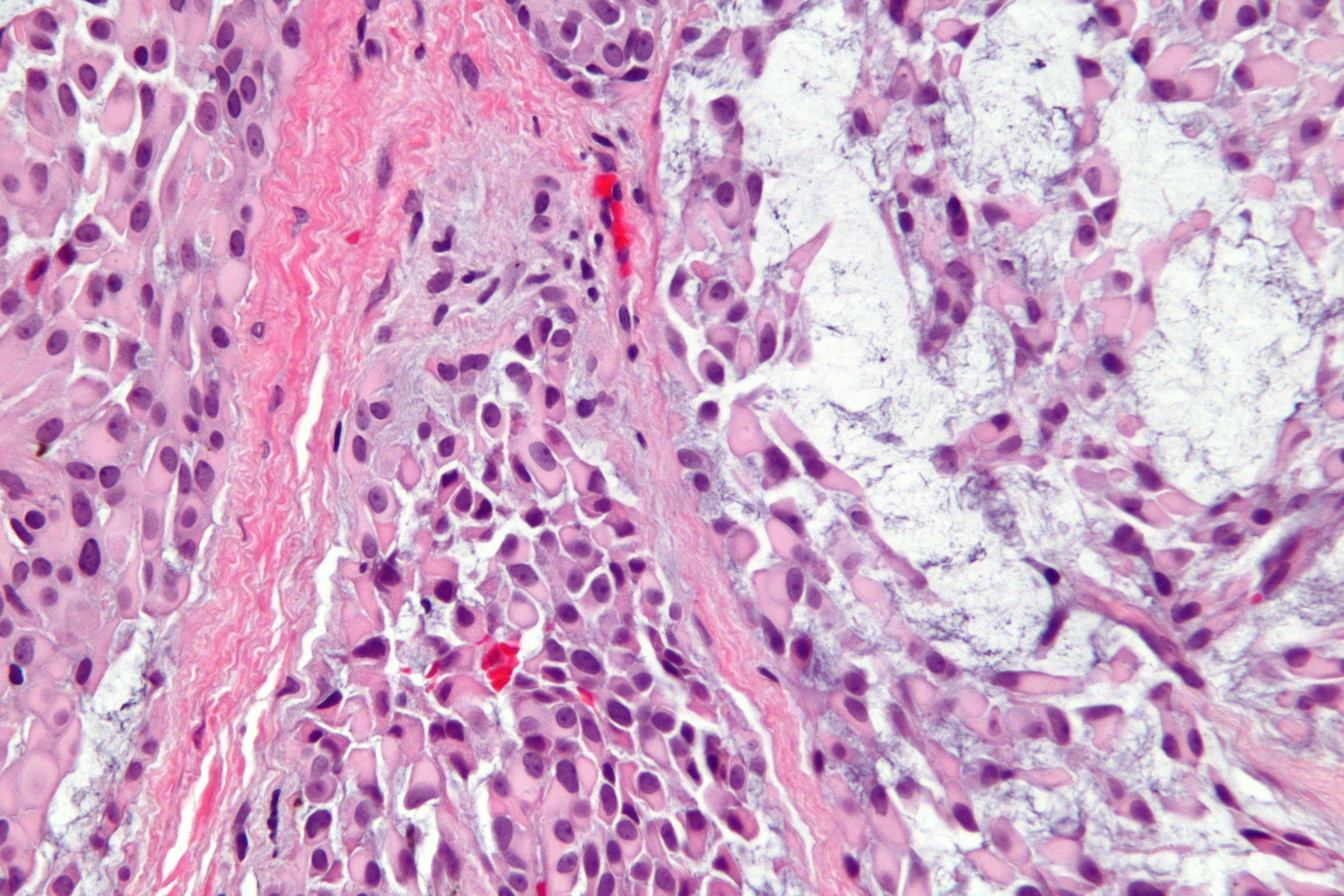
- Micrograph of a myoepithelioma. H&E stain.
- Specialty: Oncology
- Types: Benign, Malignant (rarely)

Myoepithelioma of the head and neck, also myoepithelioma, is a salivary gland tumour of the head and neck that is usually benign. When malignant, which is exceedingly rare, they are known as malignant myoepithelioma or Myoepithelial carcinoma, and they account for 1% of the salivary tumors with poor prognosis.

As the name suggests, it consists of myoepithelial cells. Classically, they are found in the parotid gland or palate. A similar tumor type may be found in the tongue, referred to as ectomesenchymal chondromyxoid tumor.

== Pathology ==
The myoepithelial cells may be spindled, plasmacytoid, eithelioid or clear. Tubules or epithelium are absent, or present in a small amount (<5%) by definition. Tumours with myoepithelial cells and a large amount of tubules are classified as pleomorphic adenomas (which must also contain the characteristic chondromyxoid stroma, which is normally absent in myoepithelioma).

== Diagnosis ==
Myoepitheliomas are diagnosed from an examination of the tissue by a pathologist.

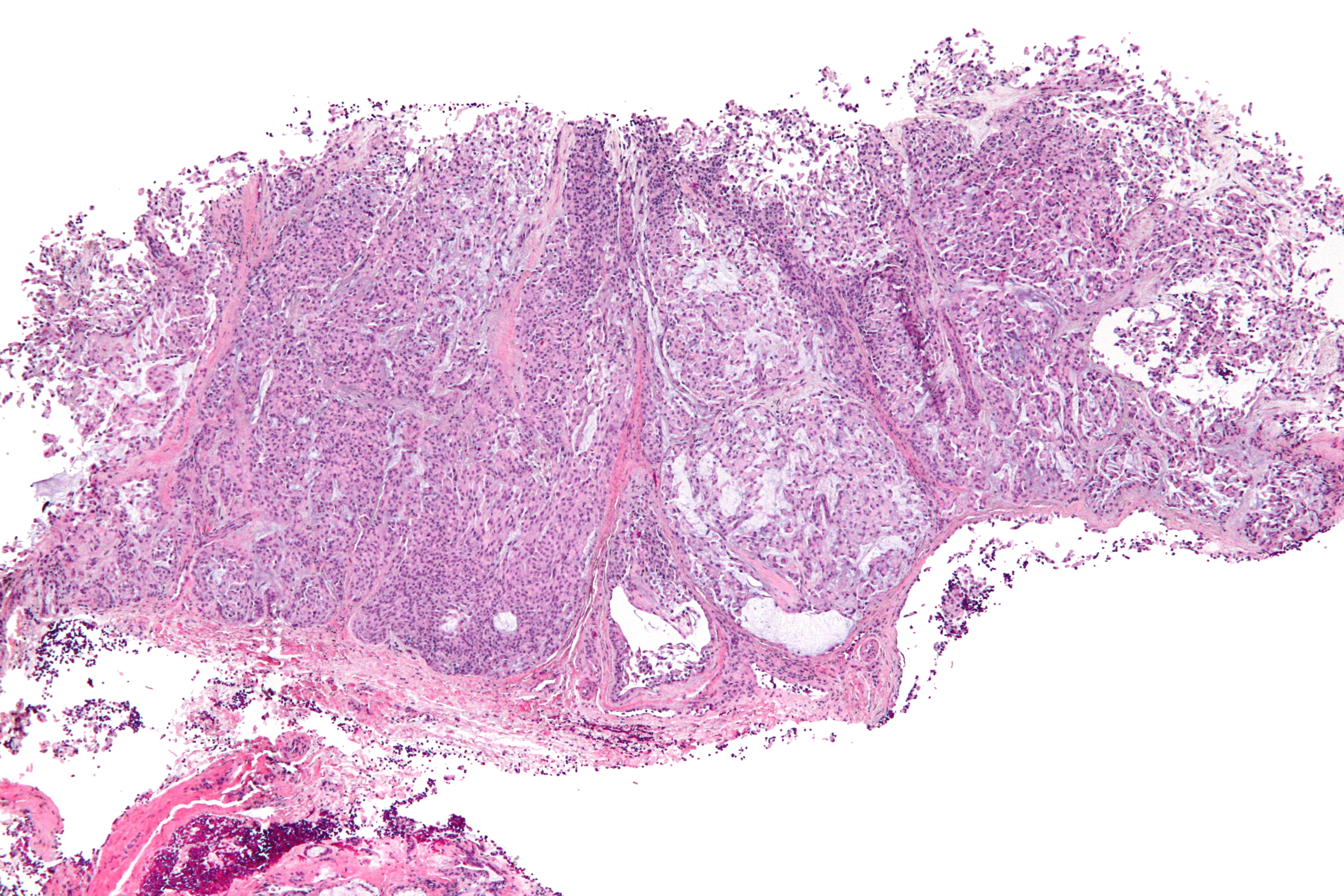
Low mag.

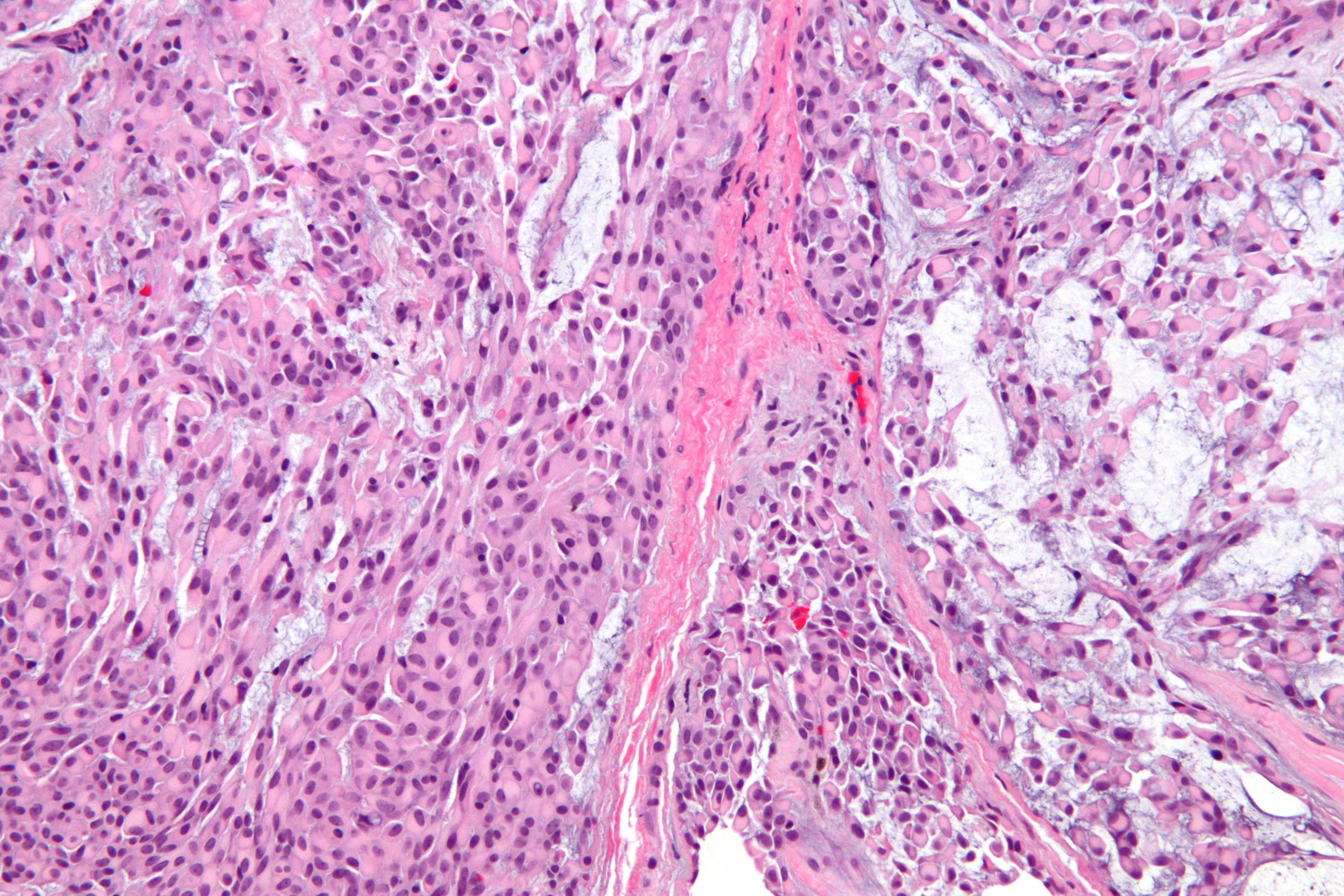
High mag.

== Treatment ==
Benign myoepithelioma are treated with simple excision. They are less prone to recurrence than pleomorphic adenoma. Malignant myoepitheliomas are excised and have been treated in the past with dacarbazine but are prone to both metastasis and re-occurrence.

== See also ==
- Pleomorphic adenoma
- Ectomesenchymal Chondromyxoid tumor
