= Diaphonization =

Staining technique used on animal specimens

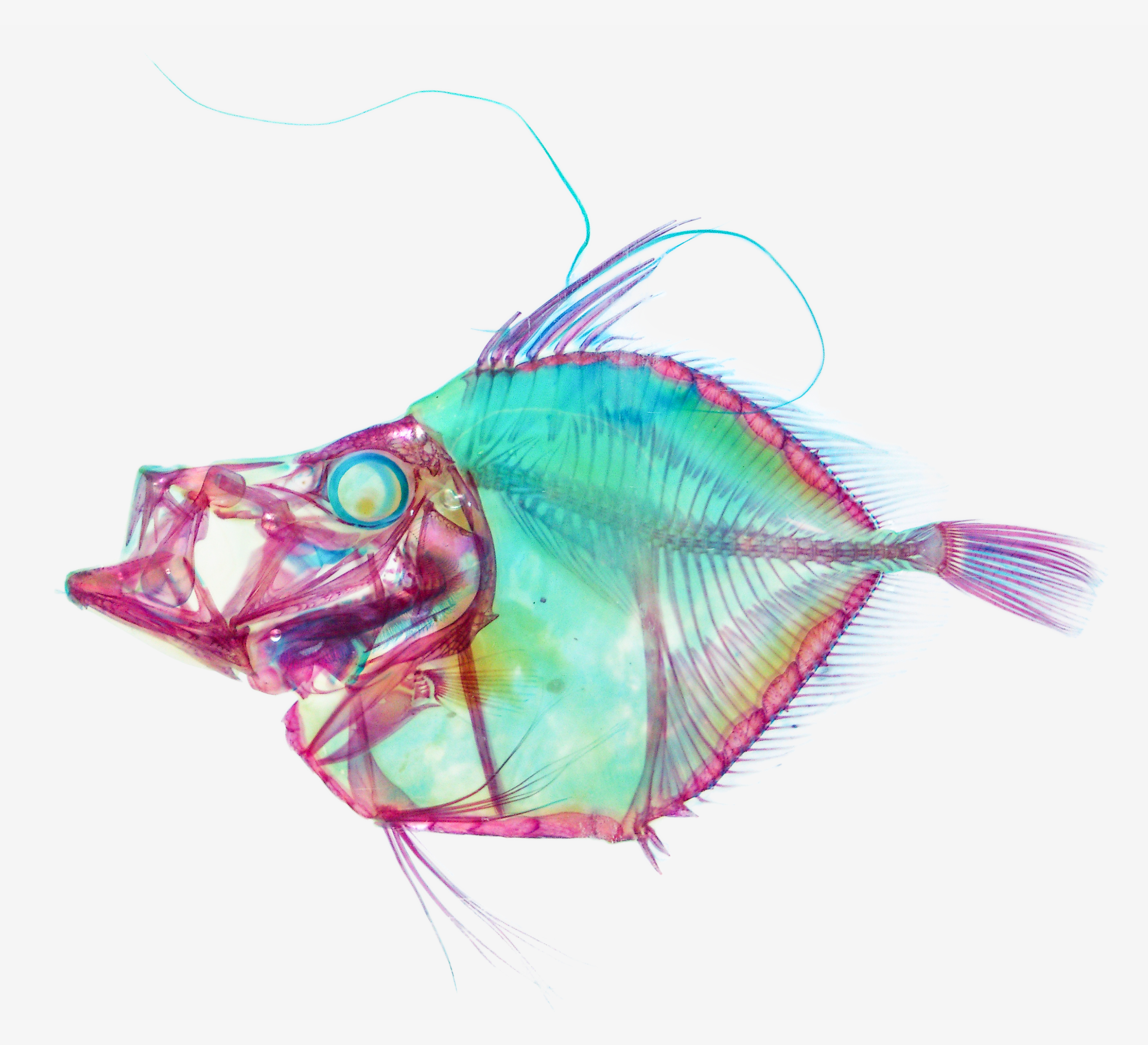
A diaphonized mirror dory. The bones are dyed red and the cartilage is dyed blue.

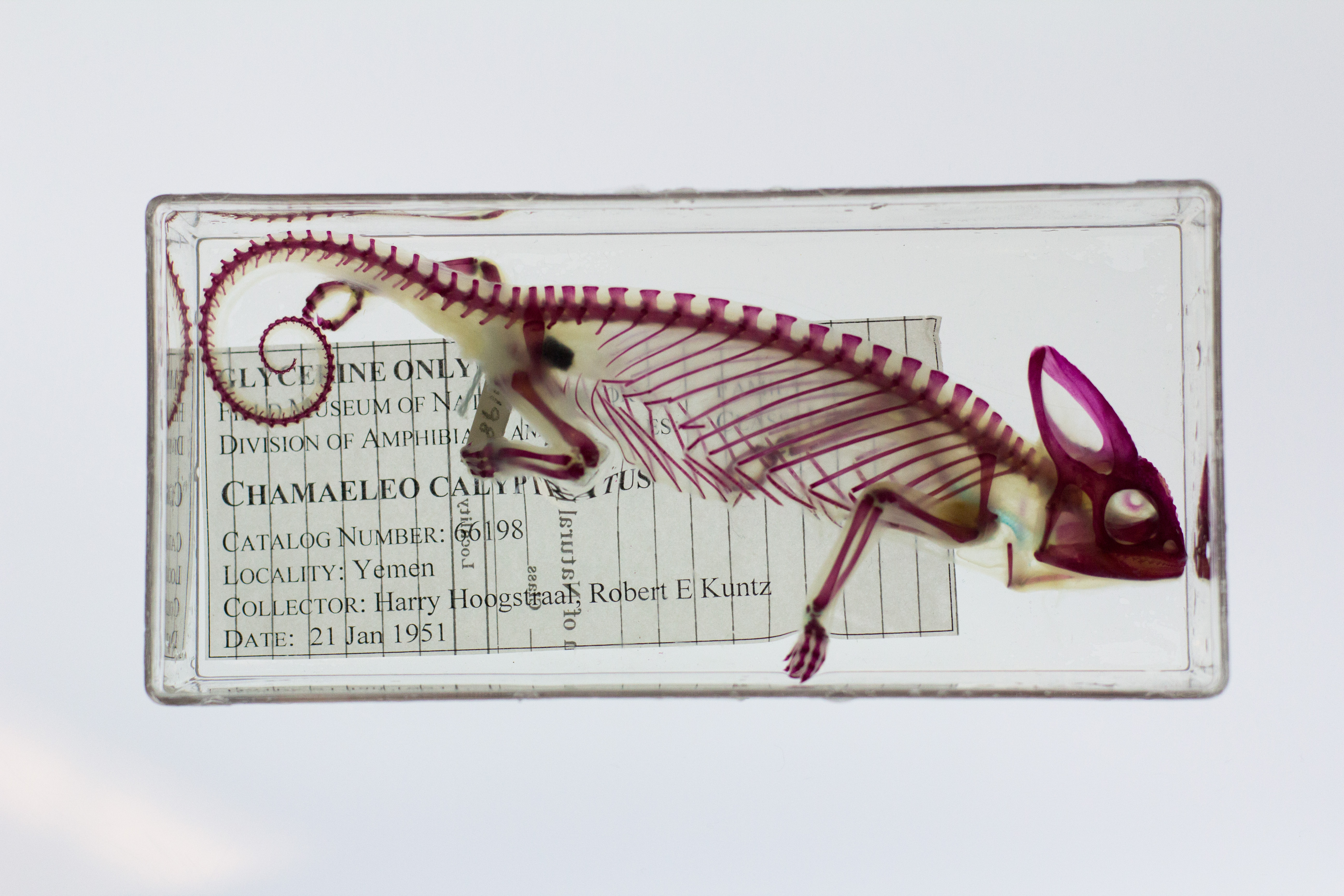
Diaphonized veiled chameleon. Field Museum of Natural History, Chicago.

Diaphonization (or diaphonisation), also known as clearing and staining, is a staining technique used on animal specimens that first renders the body of the animal transparent by bathing it in trypsin, and then stains the bones and cartilage with various dyes, usually alizarin red and alcian blue.

== History ==
Diaphonization was first developed by German anatomist Oskar Schultze in 1897, and later modified by numerous researchers.

== Technique ==
Clearing renders the animals transparent and is achieved by bathing the specimens in a soup of trypsin, a digestive enzyme that slowly breaks down flesh. The dyes alizarin red and alcian blue are most commonly used in the staining of bone and cartilage accordingly. When cleared, the specimen is put in glycerin. Despite its merits, diaphonization is not widely used in the scientific field. Advancements in imaging technology have rendered the practice all but obsolete, though it is expanding as an art form.

Diaphonization is not suitable for animals longer than 30 centimeters (except for snakes) due to the limited ability of the trypsin bath to penetrate the tissues of larger animals. It is usually used to preserve animals that are too delicate to dissect, and instead are kept as wet specimens.
