= Toluidine blue =

Names
- IUPAC name (7-amino-8-methylphenothiazin-3-ylidene)-dimethylammonium chloride
- Other names Toluidine blue O

Identifiers
CAS Number	92-31-9
3D model (JSmol)	Interactive image
ChEBI	CHEBI:87647
ChEMBL	ChEMBL1790006
ChemSpider	11239098
ECHA InfoCard	100.001.952
MeSH	Tolonium+chloride
PubChem CID	7084
UNII	15XUH0X66N
CompTox Dashboard (EPA)	DTXSID9048728
- InChI: InChI=1S/C15H16N3S.ClH/c1-9-6-13-15(8-11(9)16)19-14-7-10(18(2)3)4-5-12(14)17-13;/h4-8H,16H2,1-3H3;1H/q+1;/p-1 Key: HNONEKILPDHFOL-UHFFFAOYSA-M; InChI=1/C15H16N3S.ClH/c1-9-6-13-15(8-11(9)16)19-14-7-10(18(2)3)4-5-12(14)17-13;/h4-8H,16H2,1-3H3;1H/q+1;/p-1 Key: HNONEKILPDHFOL-REWHXWOFAY
- SMILES: [Cl-].CN(C)c1ccc2nc3cc(C)c(N)cc3[s+]c2c1

Properties
Chemical formula	C_{15}H_{16}N_{3}S^{+}
Molar mass	270.374 g/mol
- Except where otherwise noted, data are given for materials in their standard state (at 25 °C [77 °F], 100 kPa). verify (what is ?) Infobox references

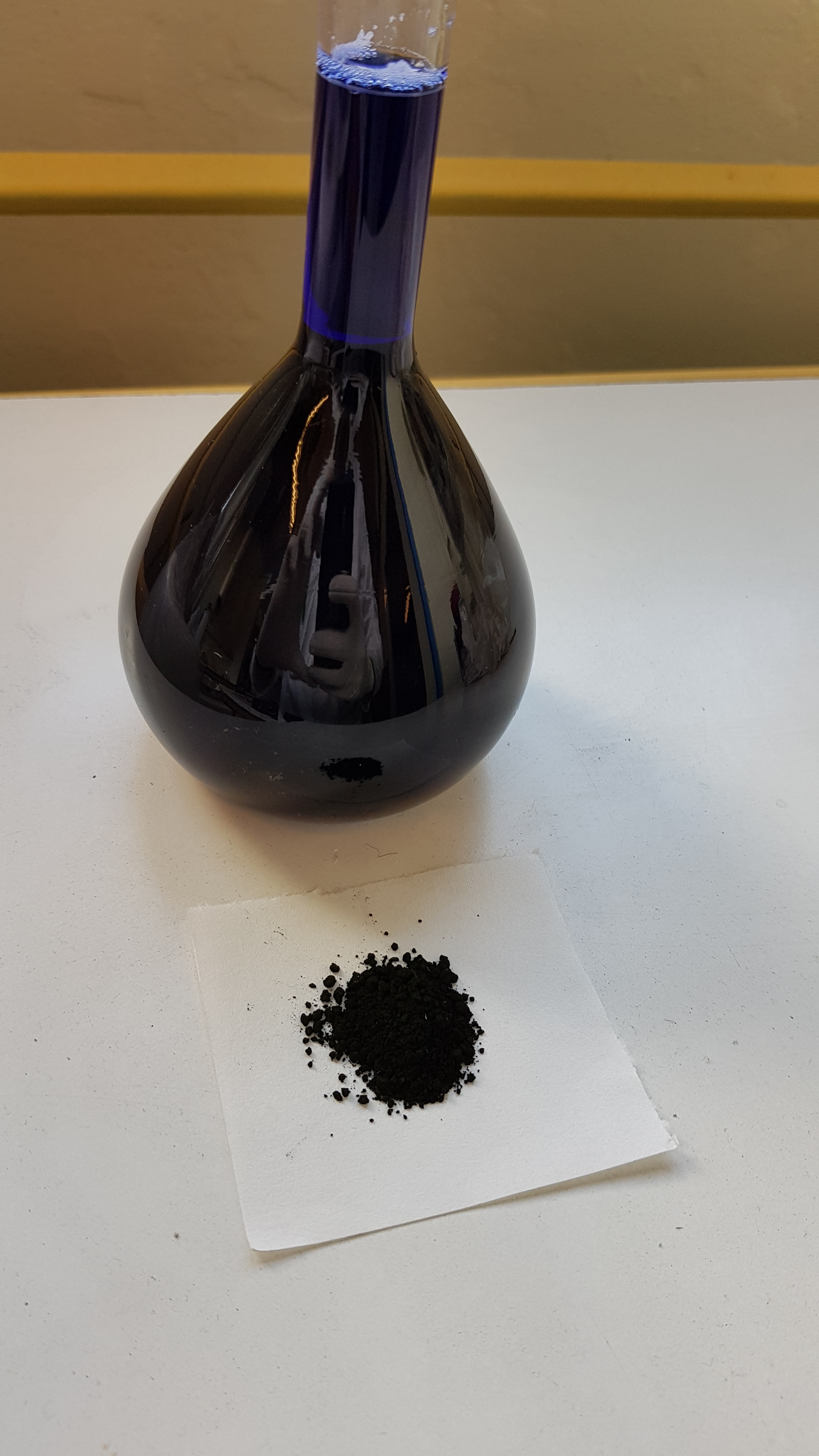
Powder and solution of toluidine blue

Toluidine blue, also known as TBO or tolonium chloride (INN) is a blue cationic (basic) dye used in histology (as the toluidine blue stain) and sometimes clinically.

== Test for lignin ==
Toluidine blue solution is used in testing for lignin, a complex organic molecule that bonds to cellulose fibres and strengthens and hardens the cell walls in plants. A positive toluidine blue test causes the solution to turn from blue to blue-green. A similar test can be performed with phloroglucinol-HCl solution, which turns red.

== Histological uses ==
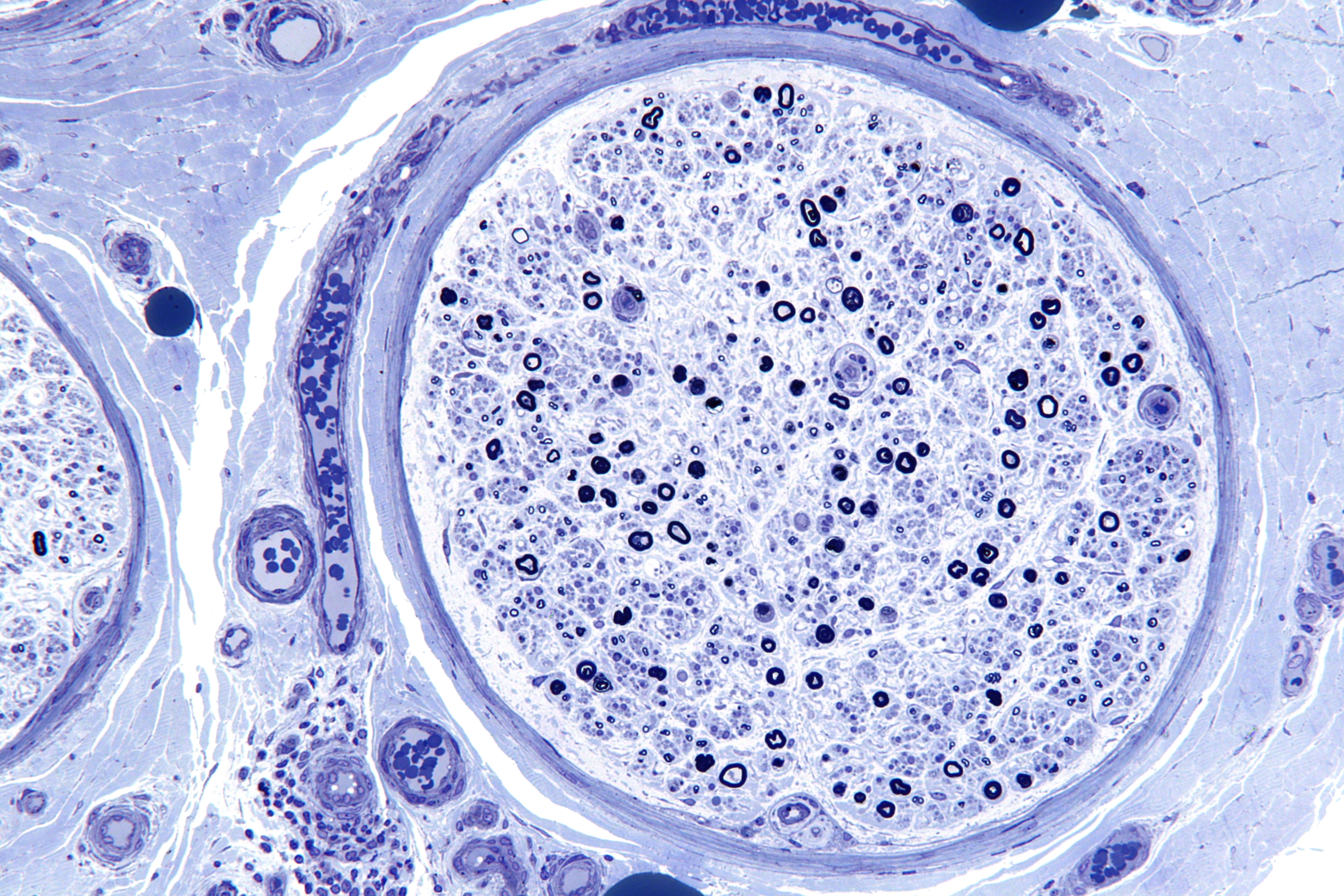
Toluidine blue stain in a vasculitic peripheral neuropathy

Toluidine blue is a basic phenothiazine metachromatic dye with high affinity for acidic tissue components. It stains nucleic acids blue and polysaccharides purple and also increases the sharpness of histology slide images. It is especially useful today for staining chromosomes in plant or animal tissues, as a replacement for Aceto-orcein stain.

Toluidine blue is often used to identify mast cells, by virtue of the heparin in their cytoplasmic granules. It is also used to stain proteoglycans and glycosaminoglycans in tissues such as cartilage. The strongly acidic macromolecular carbohydrates of mast cells and cartilage are coloured red by the blue dye, a phenomenon called metachromasia.

Alkaline solutions of toluidine blue are commonly used for staining semi-thin (0.5 to 1 μm) sections of resin-embedded tissue. At high pH (about 10) the dye binds to nucleic acids and all proteins. Although everything in the tissue is stained, structural details are clearly visible because of the thinness of the sections. Semi-thin sections are used in conjunction with ultra-thin sections examined by electron microscopy.

Toluidine blue is also commonly used to stain frozen sections (rapid microscopic analysis of a specimen). Because time is of the essence for a frozen section, toluidine blue allows for the frozen section to be stained and reviewed in 10 to 20 seconds. The other staining method for frozen sections (rapid H&E) takes approximately 60 to 90 seconds.

The results depend on the studied organs:

- Mastocytes in purple
- Cartilage in purple
- Mucins in purple/red
- Nuclei in blue

It is used in forensic examination, renal pathology and neuropathology.

== Clinical uses ==
The dye is sometimes used by surgeons to help highlight areas of mucosal dysplasia (which preferentially take up the dye compared to normal tissue) in premalignant lesions (e.g. leukoplakia). This can be used to choose the best site of the lesion to biopsy, or during surgery to remove the lesion to decide whether to remove more tissue from the margins of the excision defect or leave it behind.

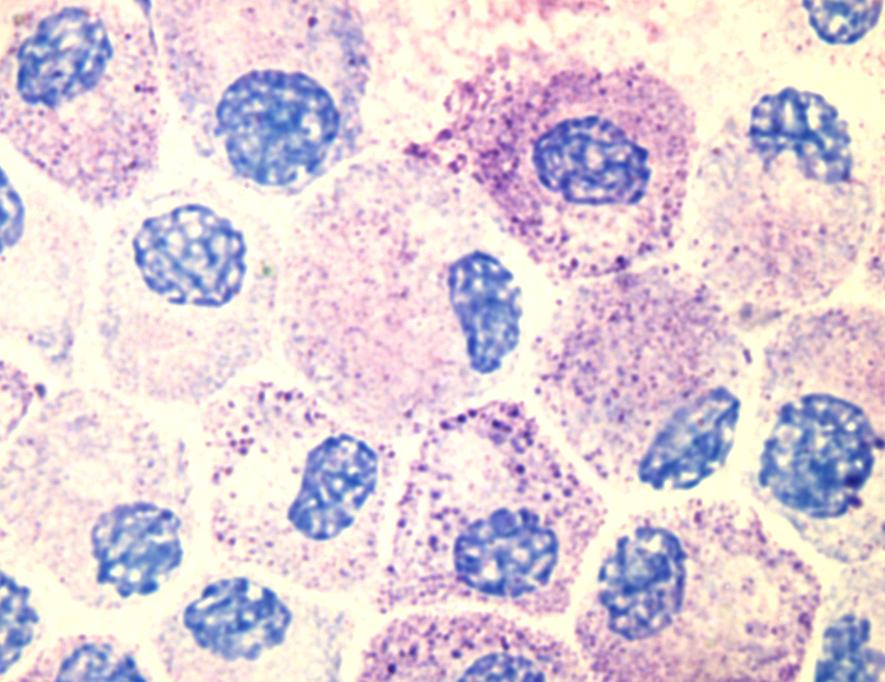
The cluster of cultured mast cells was stained with toluidine blue.

== See also ==
- Muscle biopsy
- Staining
- Toluidine red
