= Autoimmune GFAP astrocytopathy =

Autoimmune disease

- Specialty: Immunology

Autoimmune GFAP Astrocytopathy is an autoimmune disease in which the immune system of the patient attacks a protein of the nervous system called glial fibrillary acidic protein (GFAP). It was described in 2016 by researchers of the Mayo Clinic in the United States.

GFAP is an intermediate filament (IF) protein that is expressed by numerous cell types of the central nervous system (CNS) including astrocytes. The destruction of astrocytes can lead to the development of a glial scar.

There are multiple disorders associated with improper GFAP regulation and glial scarring is a consequence of several neurodegenerative conditions. The scar is formed by astrocytes interacting with fibrous tissue to re-establish the glial margins around the central injury core and is partially caused by up-regulation of GFAP.

== Signs and symptoms ==
The reported symptoms are:

- myelitis (68.4%)
- headache (63.2%)
- abnormal vision (63.2%)
- fever (52.6%)
- ataxia (36.8%)
- psychosis (31.6%)
- dyskinesia (15.8%)
- dementia (15.8%)
- seizure (10.5%)

Under MRI these patients show a characteristic radial enhancing and laminar patterns. In an early report, most patients had brain abnormalities (89.5%), of which eight (42.1%) revealed the characteristic radial enhancing and laminar patterns. Cortical abnormalities were found in one-fifth of patients (21.1%). Other abnormalities were found in the hypothalamus, midbrain, pons, medulla cerebellum, meninges, and skull. Eleven patients had longitudinally extensive spinal cord lesions. CSF abnormalities were detected in all patients.

== Clinical courses ==
GFAP autoimmunity comprises a spectrum of presentations of meningoencephalomyelitis. Specifically, some courses can be described as relapsing autoimmune meningoencephalomyelitis.

Seropositivity distinguishes autoimmune GFAP meningoencephalomyelitis from disorders commonly considered in the differential diagnosis.

The clinical presentations include:

- meningoencephalomyelitis
- encephalitis
- movement disorder (choreoathetosis or myoclonus)
- anti-epileptic drugs (AED)-resistant epilepsy
- cerebellar ataxia
- myelitis
- optic neuritis

Some clinical courses could be coincident with neuromyelitis optica clinical cases.

== Causes ==
The reason that anti-GFAP autoantibodies appear is currently unknown. There is the possibility that GFAP is not pathogenic, but just an unspecific biomarker of several heterogeneous CNS inflammations. According to this hypothesis, GFAP antibody itself does not induce pathological changes; it is only a biomarker for the process of immune inflammation

== Diagnosis ==
Currently, it is diagnosed by the presence of anti-GFAP autoantibodies in CNS. Detection of GFAP-IgG in CSF by IFA and confirmation by GFAPα-CBA is recommended.

== Treatment ==
Steroids and immunosuppressive treatment have been tried with limited effects.
