= Alcian blue stain =

Names
- Other names Alcian blue 8GX, Ingrain blue 1, C.I. 74240, "chloromethylated copper phthalocyanine-thiourea reaction products"

Identifiers
CAS Number	33864-99-2
3D model (JSmol)	Interactive image
ChemSpider	2341620
ECHA InfoCard	100.046.990
PubChem CID	3084579
UNII	P4448TJR7J
CompTox Dashboard (EPA)	DTXSID60388977
- InChI: InChI=1S/C56H68N16S4.4ClH.Cu/c1-65(2)53(66(3)4)73-29-33-17-21-37-41(25-33)49-58-45(37)57-46-38-22-18-35(31-75-55(69(9)10)70(11)12)27-43(38)51(59-46)64-52-44-28-36(32-76-56(71(13)14)72(15)16)20-24-40(44)48(63-52)62-50-42-26-34(19-23-39(42)47(60-49)61-50)30-74-54(67(5)6)68(7)8;;;;;/h17-28H,29-32H2,1-16H3;4*1H;/q+2;;;;;+2/p-4 Key: KDXHLJMVLXJXCW-UHFFFAOYSA-J; InChI=1/C56H68N16S4.4ClH.Cu/c1-65(2)53(66(3)4)73-29-33- 17-21-37-41(25-33)49-58-45(37)57-46-38-22-18-35(31-75-55 (69(9)10)70(11)12)27-43(38)51(59-46)64-52-44-28-36(32-76- -56(71(13)14)72(15)16)20-24-40(44)48(63-52)62-50-42-26- 34(19-23-39(42)47(60-49)61-50)30-74-54(67(5)6)68(7)8;;;;;/h17- -28H,29-32H2,1-16H3;4*1H;/q+2;;;;;+2/p-4/fC56H68N16S4.4 Cl.Cu/h;4*1h;/qm;4*-1;m; InChI=1/C56H68N16S4.4ClH.Cu/c1-65(2)53(66(3)4)73-29-33-17-21-37-41(25-33)49-58-45(37)57-46-38-22-18-35(31-75-55(69(9)10)70(11)12)27-43(38)51(59-46)64-52-44-28-36(32-76-56(71(13)14)72(15)16)20-24-40(44)48(63-52)62-50-42-26-34(19-23-39(42)47(60-49)61-50)30-74-54(67(5)6)68(7)8;;;;;/h17-28H,29-32H2,1-16H3;4*1H;/q+2;;;;;+2/p-4 Key: KDXHLJMVLXJXCW-XBHQNQODAQ
- SMILES: CN(C)C(=[N+](C)C)SCC1=CC2=C(C=C1)C3=NC4=NC(=NC5=C6C=C(C=CC6=C([N-]5)N=C7C8=C(C=CC(=C8)CSC(=[N+](C)C)N(C)C)C(=N7)N=C2[N-]3)CSC(=[N+](C)C)N(C)C)C9=C4C=CC(=C9)CSC(=[N+](C)C)N(C)C.[Cl-].[Cl-].[Cl-].[Cl-].[Cu+2]

Properties
Chemical formula	C_{56}H_{68}Cl_{4}CuN_{16}S_{4}
Molar mass	1298.86 g·mol^{−1}
- Except where otherwise noted, data are given for materials in their standard state (at 25 °C [77 °F], 100 kPa). verify (what is ?) Infobox references

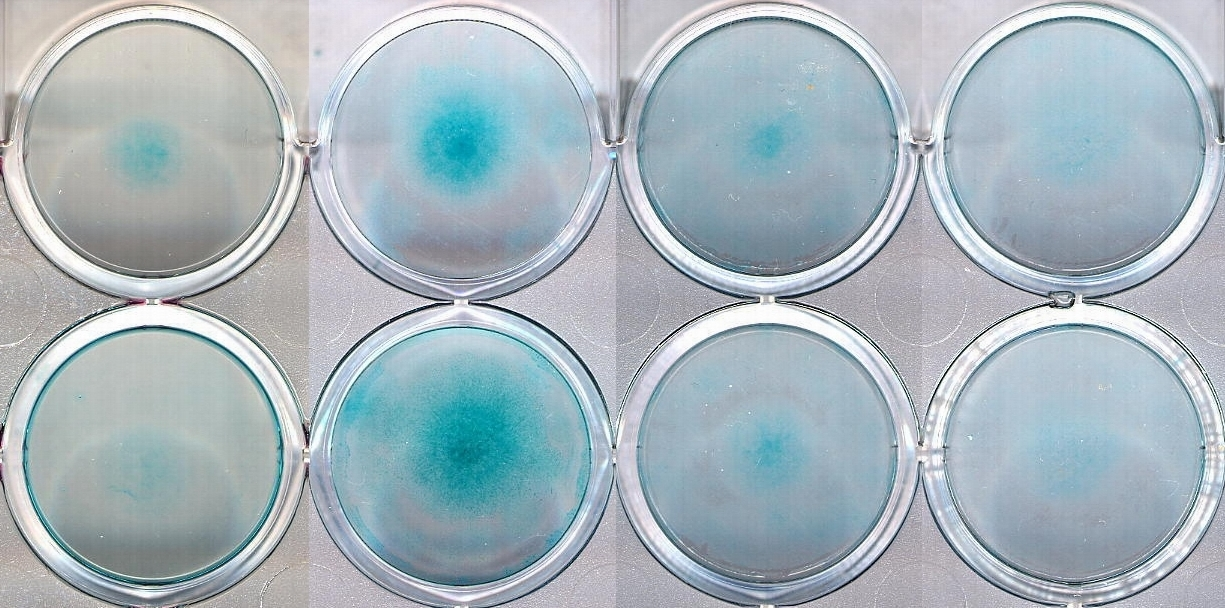
Micromass cultures of C3H-10T1/2 cells at varied oxygen tensions stained with Alcian blue.

Alcian blue (/ˈælʃən/) is any member of a family of polyvalent basic dyes, of which the Alcian blue 8G (also called Ingrain blue 1, and C.I. 74240, formerly called Alcian blue 8GX from the name of a batch of an ICI product) has been historically the most common and the most reliable member. It is used to stain acidic polysaccharides such as glycosaminoglycans in cartilages and other body structures, some types of mucopolysaccharides, sialylated glycocalyx of cells etc. For many of these targets it is one of the most widely used cationic dyes for both light and electron microscopy. Use of alcian blue has historically been a popular staining method in histology especially for light microscopy in paraffin embedded sections and in semithin resin sections. The tissue parts that specifically stain by this dye become blue to bluish-green after staining and are called "Alcianophilic" (comparable to "eosinophilic" or "sudanophilic"). Alcian blue staining can be combined with H&E staining, PAS staining and van Gieson staining methods. Alcian blue can be used to quantitate acidic glycans both in microspectrophotometric quantitation in solution or for staining glycoproteins in polyacrylamide gels or on western blots. Biochemists had used it to assay acid polysaccharides in urine since the 1960s for diagnosis of diseases like mucopolysaccharidosis but from 1970's, partly due to lack of availability of Alcian and partly due to length and tediousness of the procedure, alternative methods had to be developed such as the dimethyl methylene blue (DMB or DMMB) method.

John E. Scott, the first person outside the dye industry to crack the chemical secret of this dye, comments:

"Probably no other dyestuff has been applied to such wide variety of problems in biology and medicine. On the other hand, no other dyestuff had such a chequered history as AB."

In addition to its wide use as a stain, Alcian blue has also been used in other diverse applications e.g. gelling agent for lubricating fluids, modifiers for electrodes, charged coating agents etc.

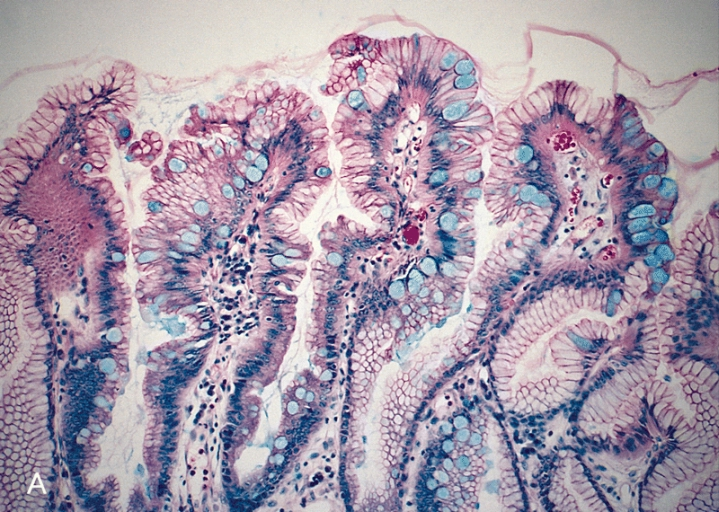
Alcian blue stain highlighting the goblet cells of Barrett's esophagus

== History ==
The Monstral blue found to coat the inside of copper vessels used to process phthalic acid derivatives had led to the discovery of Phthalocyanine in 1907. Attracted by the brilliance, stability and insolubility of this chromophore, attempts were made to reversibly modify it so that it would be carried into fabric in a solution and then easily precipitated (ingrained) into an unleachable but finely well dispersed deposit (hence the name "ingrain dyeing"). From this attempt, Alcian blue (Ingrain blue 1) was first synthesized by the ICI dyestuffs department under N. H. Haddock and C. Wood in the early 1940s and patented in 1947, originally as a textile dye. In 1950 it was used by Steedman as a selective dye for mucins. While the popularity of Alcian blue expanded exponentially, the difficulty involved in its production due to environmentally hazardous intermediate steps made its availability difficult and ICI stopped producing it by 1973. Many of the alternate sources sold similar looking color products with unreliable staining.

Prof J. E. Scott worked to decipher the chemistry of Alcian blue, which was known only to the Industry but kept as a tight trade secret. After spending 3 man-years of effort in 1972 he published the structure of Alcian blue and was able to get ICI to confirm it in 1973, incidentally in the same time that ICI also had just stopped producing it.

After the interim crisis since the 1970s when ICI had to stop, there have now been environmentally safe alternative industrial manufacturing of this dye that is supposed to work as well as 8GX but is called 8G since it is made differently. In attempt to answer what was the importance of discovering an alternative method of manufacturing this compound, a company (Anatech Ltd, USA) that remanufactured Alcian blue says:

"Alcian blue is highly selective for the tissue substances (given the proper solution pH), and forms insoluble complexes that withstand harsh subsequent treatment (like PAS) without destaining. That is what makes this dye so important. Do any other dyes have this attribute? Yes, two others to be exact, out of thousands listed in the Colour Index and Conn's Biological Stains." These two are 'Alcian yellow' and basic red 18, which are again both equally unavailable and also lack the brilliant contrast of the blue.

== Etymology and capitalization of "Alcian" ==
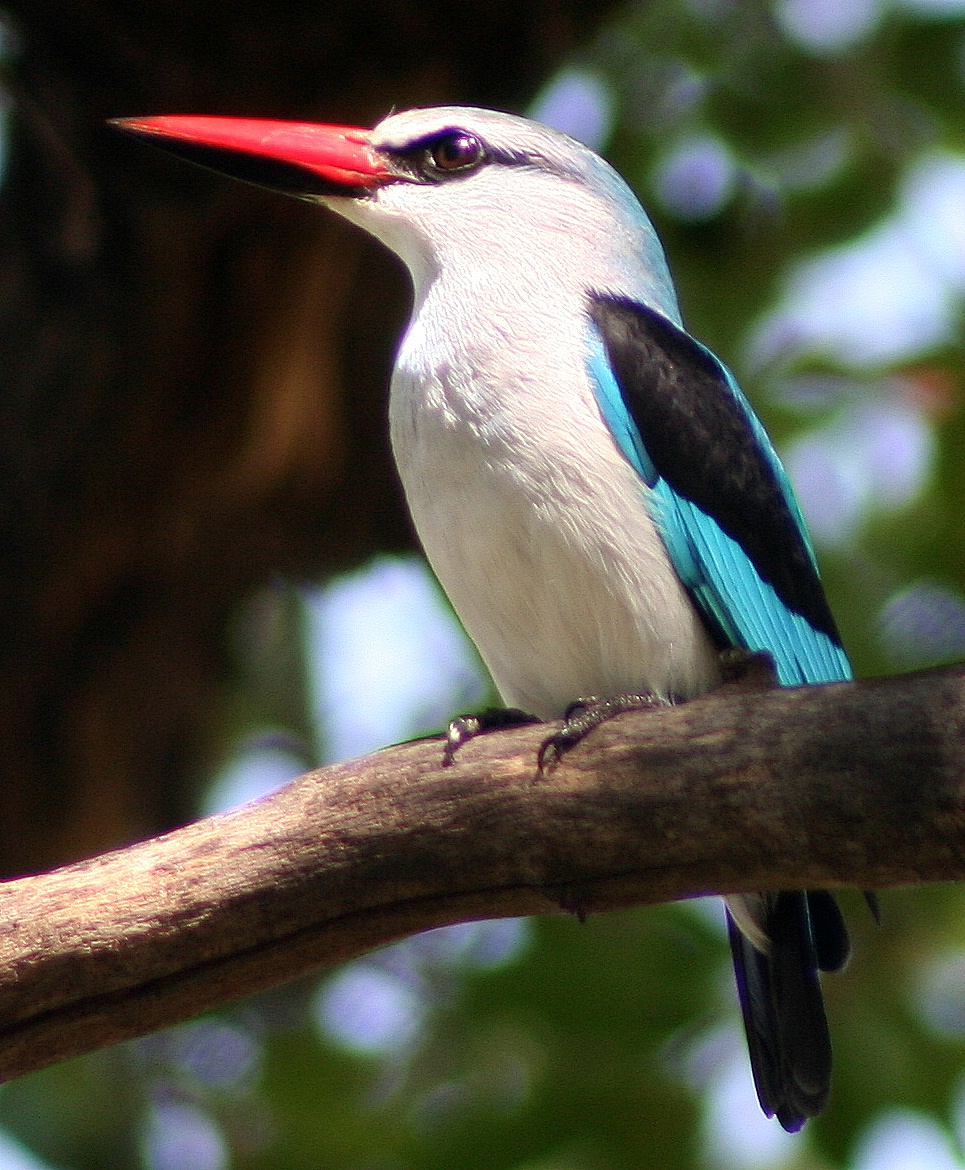
One of the Halcyon Kingfishers whose name comes from a Greek myth where Alcyone was converted to this bird and caused the calmness of the seas during the Halcyon Days.

The etymology of the name is not certain, and whether to capitalize it is an editorial style choice. Two major scientific and medical dictionaries use the lowercase styling, but there is also worthy support for the capitalized styling (discussed below). According to Elsevier's dictionary of chemoetymology, the Alcian in Alcian blue might have been coined by contraction (and slight alteration) of phthalocyanine.". Oxford online dictionary mentions that it was a trademark and also specifies

"1940s: Alcian perhaps from (phth)al(o)cyan'(ine) with a phonetic respelling".

This hypothesis is consistent with the name of Alcian green, which is a tetraphenyl-phthalocyanine with copper.

However Prof. J. E. Scott who had cracked the chemistry of Alcian blue himself and later received confirmation from the manufacturer (ICI) wrote that Alcian was a trademark that ICI preferred to be spelt starting with a capital "A", and he presumes it came from the old English word "halcyon", which has a "romantic and poetic associations with the kingfisher bird and calm seas". Prof. Scott also states that Alcian green was merely a mixture of Alcian blue and Alcian yellow and not a single compound, which is also supported by thin layer chromatography data from various sources e.g. works by another dye expert Prof. R. W. Horobin—one of the two chief editors of the 10th edition of the 75-year-old Conn's Biological Stains Manual published on behalf of the Biological Stain Commission.

Alcian yellow is an azo dye having neither a phthalocyanine ring nor any of the colors of the Kingfisher, but in common with Alcian blue, has hydrolyzable charged thiouronium side-chains and similar stability of the final stained product. On the other hand, there are other phthalocyanine dyes such as Luxol fast blue and Durazol blue, which have not acquired "Alcian" as a part of their names.

== Physical properties ==
=== Color ===
The solid Alcian blue is obtained as greenish-black (or sometimes dark bluish violet) crystals with metallic sheen. The aqueous solution is bright greenish-blue. Though the compound alcian blue itself is unstable (see stability below) the staining it produces is stable and light fast .

=== Paradoxic lack of Metachromasia ===
Unlike tricyclic thiazines (e.g. toluidine blue, methylene blue and azure A etc.), which are metachromatic due to switching from monomeric to stacked aggregates, Alcian blue is apparently orthochromatic. In common with Astra blue and other similar dyes, this property that it does not change color either by change in concentration or by combination with substrates, makes it very suitable for microspectrophotometry. The apparent lack of metachromasia is not because it is truly orthochromatic but because "it is already fully metachromatic" in aqueous solution.

==== Absorption maximum affected by aggregation ====
In aqueous solution large numbers of Alcian blue molecules stack together as micelles of very large size, too large to be even dialysed. Thus even at a fairly high dilution, it has an absorption maximum at ~600–615 nm, which is actually not the absorption maximum of a dye monomer but that of the multimer. Since the absorbed light is of yellow orange spectrum, the transmitted/reflected light is perceived by our eye as the complementary color of slightly greenish blue or cyan. In aqueous solution Alcian blues continue to be metachromatic at molar concentrations one hundredth those at which toluidine blue is mainly orthochromatic. Only a very small shoulder of the absorption curve at 670–680 nm represent the monomeric dye, which is usually the minority and becomes even lesser minority (<10^{8}M) in presence of salts. However, when the solvent is DMSO—a non-protic solvent of moderately high dielectric constant, Alcian blue does not aggregate and a big monomeric absorption peak can be well visualized. A similar spectral shift to the longer monomeric peak is also observed when solvents like ethanol (or ethanol water mixture) is used as a vehicle or when nonionic detergents like Triton X-100 are used, that make exogenous micelles.

=== Molar extinction coefficient ===
Alcians blue carries Phthalocyanine one of the most highly colored chromophores yet known with a molar extinction of 120,000 i.e. Alcian blue is detectable at half the molar concentration of popular dyes like toluidine blue, tryarylmethanes (e.g. pararosaniline and the analogous Schiff bases used in PAS stain, crystal violet in Gram stain) etc.

=== Solubility ===
It is water-soluble. When each of the pair of substituents on the pendant group nitrogens are toluyl, the solubility in water at 20 °C is about 9.5% w/w; and similarly a few other solubilities are: 6.0% in absolute ethanol, 6.0% in Cellosolve and 3.25% ethylene glycol, whereas it is practically insoluble in xylene. In relative/partitioning terms, Alcian Blue 8G has a log octanol-water partition coefficient (Log P) of −9.7, suggesting it is rather water-soluble (lipid-soluble if Log P > 0, and good lipid stains generally have a Log P > 7). Methanol is an acceptable substitute for ethanol as a potential vehicle for Alcian blue, but isopropanol is not, because, within a few hours all of suspended Alcian blue precipitates if isopropanol is tried as a vehicle.

=== Melting point ===
The sample compound with Merck index number 218 has a melting point of 148 °C.

== Chemistry ==
It is a tetravalent basic (cationic) dye with a copper (Cu^{2+}, coordination 4 of 6, orbital configuration d^{9} with Jahn–Teller distortion) phthalocyanine nucleus (CuPc) with three or four pendent isothiouronium side chains imparting its bulkiness and positive charges. In order to qualify as an alcian blue family member there has to be at least 2 side chains and the mixtures often have 3 chains in average to qualify as 8G. Four tetramethylisothiouronium groups per molecule are shown in the picture. ICI had claimed an average of about three side chains per molecule, but analyses by Prof Scotts lab suggested between three and four. Most of them are at the 2(3) positions, as in the formula and sometimes a cartoon representation uses the methylene bridge criss crossing across the bond between these two positions to indicate that it could bind either of these two positions. A large number of isomers, differing in the positions of the cationic groups, are possible. Alcian blue 7GX carries fewer isothiouronium groups than 8GX. Similarly 5GX and 2GX may have even fewer side groups but it was not rigorously proven.

The phthalocyanine aromatic nucleus has a large conjugated system with a CBN (Conjugated bond number) of 48. However it is the charges on the isothiouronium side groups that still keeps it water-soluble. These side groups can carry bulkier alkyl or aryl substituents rather than the 8x2 methyl groups as in the image given. These groups split off from the macrocyclic ring during the washing at the end of staining or by rather mild conditions (e.g. pH above 5.6) or during spontaneous degradation.

The metals in the Phthallocyanine nucleus and substituted groups directly attached to the aromatic nucleus determine colors of the members of the metal phthallocyanine family e.g. Alcian Blue and the copper phthalocyanine itself are blue, but brominated or chlorinated copper phthalocyanine and sulfonated copper phthalocyanine are green.

Alcian Blue has a relatively high solubility in salt solutions and stains slower than other dyes. By changing pH or ambient salt concentrations characteristic staining patterns can be obtained.

=== pH controlled staining ===
At pH 1.0 it stains only sulfated polysaccharides and at pH 2.5 also stains carboxyl group containing sugars such as sialic acids and uronic acids intensify the stain of hyaluronic acids, which would also stain albeit relatively weakly by their half sulfate esters at pH 1.0.

=== Electrolyte controlled staining ===
A staining method where at a fixed pH of about 5.5, different critical salt concentration (classically MgCl_{2}, but NaCl, KCl, LiBr are potential alternatives) can be used where the smaller (faster diffusing) salt cation competes with alcian blue to bind to the anionic sites. Target material specific critical electrolyte concentration (CEC) is supposed to selectively identify sulphated, carboxylated and phosphated structures for example as the targets.

=== Stability ===
According to John A. Kiernan—one of the editors of the 10th edition of Conn's Biological Stains" 10th ed 2002 published on behalf of the Biological Stain Commission: Alcian blue 8G differs from most other dyes in that it can deteriorate even in the solid state, changing to an insoluble pigment. Acidic solutions of Alcian blue 8G are often stable for some years. Churukian's lab manual gives a recommended shelf life of 6 months. An Alcian blue solution with a precipitate should be discarded and replaced, not filtered and used. Some dyes sold as Alcian blue 8G are unstable in solutions at pH 5.6 and above; they precipitate in less than 24 hours. Batches of Alcian blue that do not form stable solutions cannot be used in Scott's "critical electrolyte concentration" methods for histochemical characterization of different glycosaminoglycans, which require solutions at pH 5.7–5.8 with variable concentrations of MgCl_{2}.

The pyridine variant of alcian blue (Alcian Blue-tetrakis(methylpyridinium) chloride (CAS 123439-83-8) is more stable than the original alcian blue dyes and may be just as good as a stain.

=== Explanation of staining selectivity ===
Nucleic acids are generally basophilic because they have a very high density of negative charge due to the sugar phosphate backbone. However, in contrast to other basic i.e. cationic dyes, Alcian blue usually (given the right pH and salt concentrations, and normal temperature and duration in minutes, not hours) preferably stains acidic glycosaminoglycans but not the chromatin and nissel substance, the mechanism of which had been a mystery for a long time and various theories were proposed. Though the presumed basis of the staining is its positive charge attracted to negative structures (e.g. acidic sugars), bulkiness (width 2.5–3 nm, compared to toluidine blue ~0.7 x1.1 nm) makes its diffusion very slow in less permeable parts of the tissue and thus prevent it from staining highly negative yet compact structures such as chromatin and nissl substance. However prolonged staining (few days at 25 °C) or DNA denaturing conditions may allow Alcian blue to also stain the nucleus. The isolation of the positive charge from the aromatic electron cloud by the intervening methylene bridges makes the localized positive charged regions "hard" ions in contrast to soft ions where the charge is delocalized over the whole aromatic pi cloud. When these hard cations encounter the hard anions e.g. in form of sulfate they form salts without regard for the precise chemical nature of the anion. The resulting salts are highly stable but can be slowly exchanged with high concentration of salts. Washing with water or alkali treatment after staining causes base catalyzed hydrolysis and removal of the pendant positively charged side chains and the resulting compound is Phthalocyanine Blue, which forms a blue water-insoluble dye precipitate. The precipitates are so robust that they withstand harsh conditions like PAS or other counterstaining and also dehydration and embedding treatments (in contrast toluidine blue is partially extracted away during dehydration). This unleachability is the chemical basis of the ingrain dyeing for which AB (Ingrain blue 1) was originally designed by the dye industry.

== Manufacturing and purity ==
The historic Alcian Blue varied so much batch to batch that only the 8GX (e.g. not even the 8GS) batch produced by ICI was later decided to be the biologically useful ones. Commercially available batches usually contained about 49% of the actual dye and rest used to be Sulfate, boric acid, dextrin and other impurities and by various extraction methods up to 80% pure extracts can be made. Actually the dye does not necessary contain all 4 substituents but might contain 2 or 3 of them and have various geometric isomers. But anyhow the manufacture of 8GX by ICI had stopped by Mid-1970s because of environmental hazards and very small lots were available that were received from alternate sources. Only recently Alcian Blue has been re manufactured in bulk using safer procedures but the newer product does not have the suffix X (or S) since the manufacture process (and the exact product composition) is somewhat different.

== Material safety ==
Alcian blue is an eye and respiratory tract irritant. Solid Alcian blue is a combustible powder and should never be handled close to heat or a naked flame. Heating Alcian blue produces toxic fumes of nitrogen compounds. It can react violently if mixed with oxidising materials. The solution of Alcian blue is a skin sensitiser and corrosive (partly due to the acidic pH needed to maintain it unhydrolyzed in solution) and harmful by skin absorption. Most vendor MSDS (Material safety datasheet) mention that effect of ingestion not known or target organ not known. However some do mention that potential target organs are teeth and kidneys.

== Uses in Dye Industry ==
This stain was originally discovered by ICI in the 1940s as a member of the competitive dye industry for the purpose of industrial dying. It was used for some time for staining textiles, leather products and inks. ICI sold thousands of tons of alcian blue and filed multiple patents regarding its manufacturing process to keep its chemistry a tight secret. However ICI had had trouble with the dye's solubility under textile dyeing conditions, and various process changes in manufacturing were made during the 1950s and 1960s.

== Uses other than as a dye or stain ==
In addition to its use as a dye or stain Alcian blue also finds other material science uses.

=== Adhesive ===
Alcian blue has been used as an adhesive to help stick glycol methacrylate sections to glass slides (which have negatively charged silicate groups).

=== Coating agent ===
Alcian blue carries a large aromatic surface that can participate in van der Waals interactions, as well as multiple localized charges. Thus it can be coated onto surfaces and significantly modify surface property and charge. Some cells in culture grow better on surfaces coated with positive charge like poly-L-lysine or polyornithine or Alcian blue. Alcian blue coated surfaces hold onto the negatively charged glycocalyx so tightly that it can even be used to cover a layer of cells and then float it up to peel off the roof ("unroofing") to study the cytoplasmic side of the plasma membrane.

=== Gelling or lubricating agent ===
Alcian Blue has been used as a gelling agent for lubricating fluids likely due to the stacking properties of this macrocylic aromatic compound.

== See also ==
- Phthalocyanine
  - Phthalocyanine Blue BN
  - Phthalocyanine Green G
  - Luxol fast blue
- Isothiouronium
  - Alcian Yellow
- Imperial Chemical Industries
- Glycosaminoglycan
- Proteoglycan
- Mucin
- Intestinal metaplasia
- Diaphonization
