= Toluidine red =

Names
- Other names Pigment Red 3, 1-(4-Methyl-2-nitrophenylazo)-2-naphthol

Identifiers
CAS Number	2425-85-6
3D model (JSmol)	Interactive image
ChEBI	CHEBI:82428
ChEMBL	ChEMBL2138372
ChemSpider	13615376
ECHA InfoCard	100.017.612
EC Number	219-372-2
KEGG	C19373
PubChem CID	17047
UNII	7K26S08256
CompTox Dashboard (EPA)	DTXSID8021226
- InChI: InChI=1S/C17H13N3O3/c1-11-6-8-14(15(10-11)20(22)23)18-19-17-13-5-3-2-4-12(13)7-9-16(17)21/h2-10,21H,1H3 Key: ZLFVRXUOSPRRKQ-UHFFFAOYSA-N
- SMILES: CC1=CC(=C(C=C1)N=NC2=C(C=CC3=CC=CC=C32)O)[N+](=O)[O-]

Properties
Chemical formula	C_{17}H_{13}N_{3}O_{3}
Molar mass	307.309 g·mol^{−1}
Appearance	red solid
Density	1.434 g/cm^{3}
Melting point	269 °C
Solubility in water	low

Hazards
- GHS labelling
Pictograms	(GHS05: Corrosive) (GHS09: Environmental hazard)
Signal word	Danger
Hazard statements	H318, H410, H413
Precautionary statements	P264+P265, P273, P280, P305+P354+P338, P317, P391, P501
- Except where otherwise noted, data are given for materials in their standard state (at 25 °C [77 °F], 100 kPa). Infobox references

Toluidine red is an organic compound with the formula C_{10}H_{6}(OH)(N_{2}C_{6}H_{3}(NO_{2})CH_{3}). A dark red solid, the compound is classified as a azo dye consisting of a 2-naphthol group linked to a 2-nitro-4-methylphenyl substituent. Toluidine red is a traditional pigment, found in oil paints. Although once popular, it suffers as a pigment owing to "insufficient lightfastness and bleeding when incorporated into a paint system."

== Safety ==
It is classified as carcinogenic, a property that it shares with many azo dyes.
