= Magnetic resonance imaging burn =

- Other names: MRI burn
- Specialty: Dermatology

Magnetic resonance imaging burn, also known as an MRI burn, is a cutaneous condition characterized by first-, second- or third-degree burns due to metal or wire contact with skin, creating a closed-loop conduction system.

== See also ==
- List of cutaneous conditions
