= GFAP stain =

In histology, the GFAP stain is done to determine whether cells contain glial fibrillary acidic protein, a protein found in glial cells.

It is useful for determining whether a tumour is of glial origin.
