= Leukomyelitis =

Medical condition

Leukomyelitis, also known as acute spasmodic paraplegia, is a disorder of the central nervous system. It affects only the "white matter" of the spinal cord.

Leukomyelitis has been observed in animals such as rats, sheep and goats, as well as humans.
