= Glial fibrillary acidic protein =

Type III intermediate filament protein

GFAP
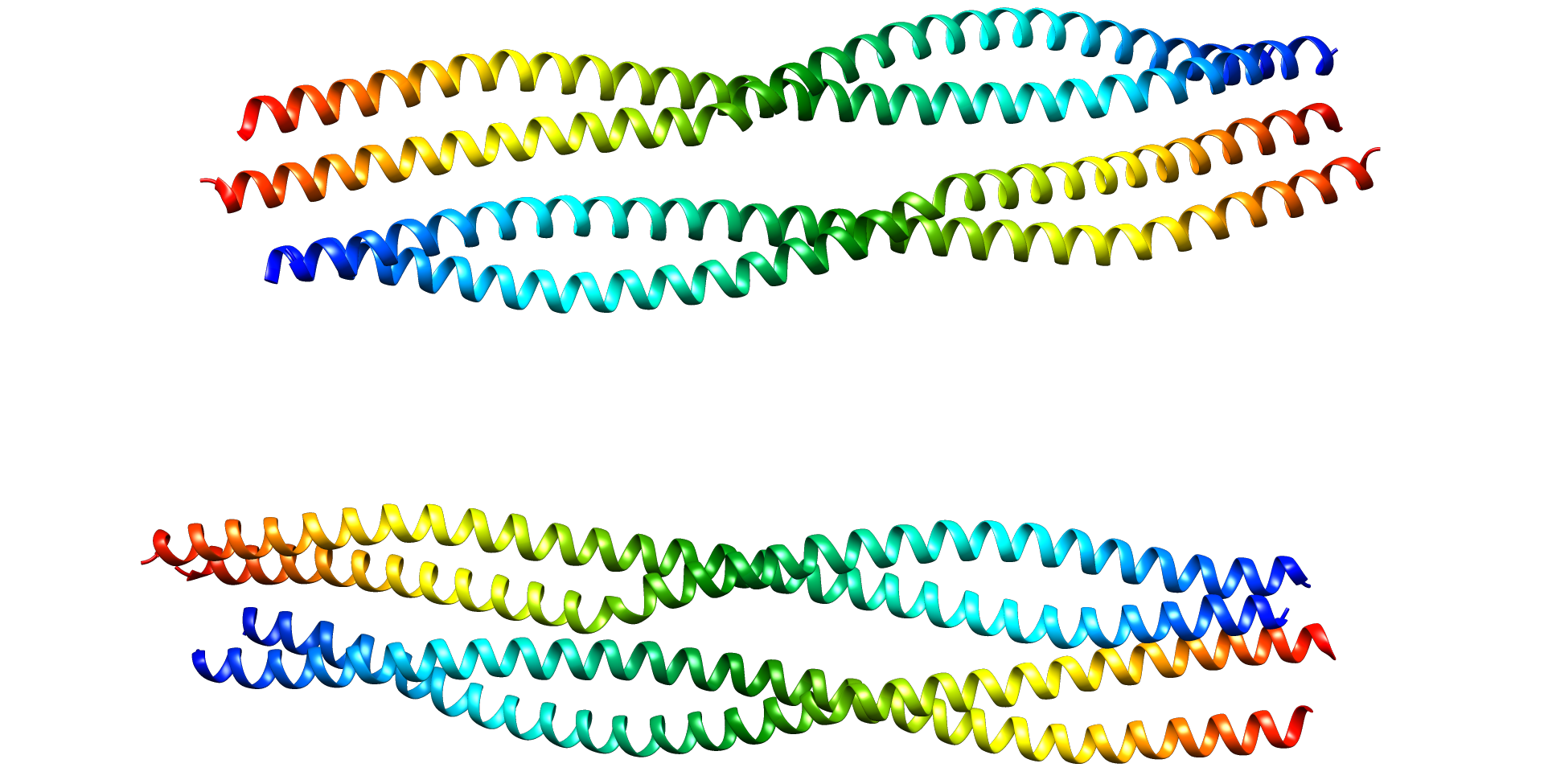

Identifiers
- Aliases: GFAP, ALXDRD, glial fibrillary acidic protein
- External IDs: OMIM: 137780; MGI: 95697; GeneCards: GFAP
Available structures
| PDB | Ortholog search: PDBe RCSB |
| PDB | List of PDB id codes 6A9P |

Gene location (Human)
| Chr. | Chromosome 17 (human) |
| Band | 17q21.31 | Start | 44,903,159 bp |
| Band | 17q21.31 | End | 44,916,937 bp |

Gene location (Mouse)
| Chr. | Chromosome 11 (mouse) |
| Band | 11 E1|11 66.48 cM | Start | 102,778,162 bp |
| Band | 11 E1|11 66.48 cM | End | 102,791,738 bp |
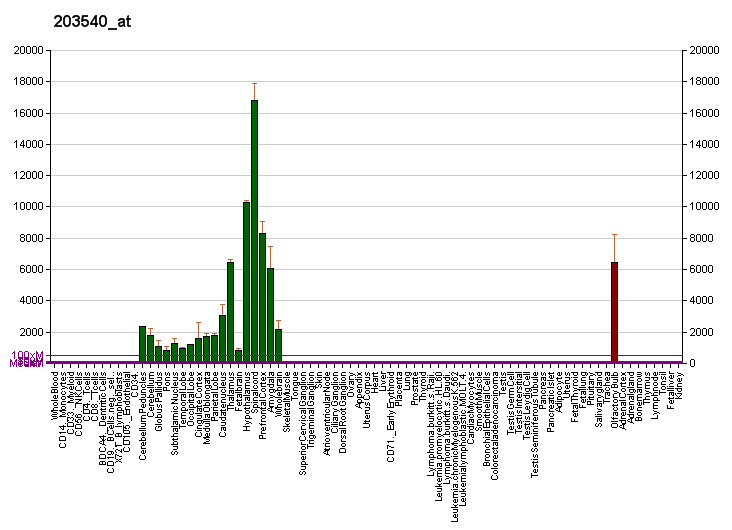
RNA expression pattern
| Bgee | Human / Mouse (ortholog); Top expressed in: dorsal motor nucleus of vagus nerve; inferior olivary nucleus; ventral tegmental area; external globus pallidus; superior vestibular nucleus; C1 segment; optic nerve; subthalamic nucleus; hypothalamus; pars reticulata / Top expressed in: optic nerve; dentate gyrus of hippocampal formation granule cell; pontine nuclei; lumbar subsegment of spinal cord; supraoptic nucleus; ganglion cell layer; median eminence; superior colliculus; habenula; primary visual cortex; More reference expression data |
| BioGPS | More reference expression data |
Gene ontology
| Molecular function | structural molecule activity; protein binding; identical protein binding; integrin binding; structural constituent of cytoskeleton; kinase binding |
| Cellular component | cytoplasm; cytosol; lysosome; intermediate filament; intracellular anatomical structure; membrane; cell projection; myelin sheath; cell body; glial cell projection; astrocyte projection; astrocyte end-foot; cytoplasmic side of lysosomal membrane; cytoskeleton |
| Biological process | regulation of protein-containing complex assembly; response to wounding; positive regulation of Schwann cell proliferation; negative regulation of neuron projection development; astrocyte development; extracellular matrix organization; neuron projection regeneration; intermediate filament-based process; regulation of neurotransmitter uptake; Bergmann glial cell differentiation; positive regulation of glial cell proliferation; long-term potentiation; regulation of chaperone-mediated autophagy; intermediate filament organization |
Sources:Amigo / QuickGO
Orthologs
| Databases | NCBI: entry; OMA: entry |
| Species | Human | Mouse |
| Entrez | 2670 | 14580 |
| Ensembl | ENSG00000131095 | ENSMUSG00000020932 |
| UniProt | P14136 | P03995 |
| RefSeq (mRNA) | NM_002055; NM_001131019; NM_001242376; NM_001363846 | NM_001131020; NM_010277 |
| RefSeq (protein) | NP_001124491; NP_001229305; NP_002046; NP_001350775 | NP_001124492; NP_034407 |
| Location (UCSC) | Chr 17: 44.9 – 44.92 Mb | Chr 11: 102.78 – 102.79 Mb |
| PubMed search |
- Wikidata
| View/Edit Human | View/Edit Mouse |

Glial fibrillary acidic protein (GFAP) is a protein that is encoded by the GFAP gene in humans. It is a type III intermediate filament (IF) protein that is expressed by numerous cell types of the central nervous system (CNS), including astrocytes and ependymal cells during development. GFAP has also been found to be expressed in glomeruli and peritubular fibroblasts taken from rat kidneys, Leydig cells of the testis in both hamsters and humans, human keratinocytes, human osteocytes and chondrocytes and stellate cells of the pancreas and liver in rats.

GFAP is closely related to the other three non-epithelial type III IF family members, vimentin, desmin and peripherin, which are all involved in the structure and function of the cell's cytoskeleton. GFAP is thought to help to maintain astrocyte mechanical strength as well as the shape of cells, but its exact function remains poorly understood, despite the number of studies using it as a cell marker. The protein was named and first isolated and characterized by Lawrence F. Eng in 1969. In humans, it is located on the long arm of chromosome 17.

== Structure ==
Type III intermediate filaments contain three domains, named the head, rod and tail domains. The specific DNA sequence for the rod domain may differ between different type III intermediate filaments, but the structure of the protein is highly conserved. This rod domain coils around that of another filament to form a dimer, with the N-terminal and C-terminal of each filament aligned. Type III filaments such as GFAP are capable of forming both homodimers and heterodimers; GFAP can polymerize with other type III proteins. GFAP and other type III IF proteins cannot assemble with keratins, the type I and II intermediate filaments: in cells that express both proteins, two separate intermediate filament networks form, which can allow for specialization and increased variability.

To form networks, the initial GFAP dimers combine to make staggered tetramers, which are the basic subunits of an intermediate filament. Since rod domains alone in vitro do not form filaments, the non-helical head and tail domains are necessary for filament formation. The head and tail regions have greater variability of sequence and structure. In spite of this increased variability, the head of GFAP contains two conserved arginines and an aromatic residue that have been shown to be required for proper assembly.

== Function ==
GFAP is expressed in the central nervous system (CNS) in astrocytes, and the concentration of GFAP differs between different regions in the CNS, where the highest levels are found in medulla oblongata, cervical spinal cord and hippocampus. It is involved in many important CNS processes, including cell communication and the functioning of the blood brain barrier.

GFAP has been shown to play a role in mitosis by adjusting the filament network present in the cell. During mitosis, there is an increase in the amount of phosphorylated GFAP, and a movement of this modified protein to the cleavage furrow. There are different sets of kinases at work; cdc2 kinase acts only at the G2 phase transition, while other GFAP kinases are active at the cleavage furrow alone. This specificity of location allows for precise regulation of GFAP distribution to the daughter cells. Studies have also shown that GFAP knockout mice undergo multiple degenerative processes including abnormal myelination, white matter structure deterioration, and functional/structural impairment of the blood–brain barrier. These data suggest that GFAP is necessary for many critical roles in the CNS.

GFAP is proposed to play a role in astrocyte-neuron interactions as well as cell-cell communication. In vitro, using antisense RNA, astrocytes lacking GFAP do not form the extensions usually present with neurons. Studies have also shown that Purkinje cells in GFAP knockout mice do not exhibit normal structure, and these mice demonstrate deficits in conditioning experiments such as the eye-blink task. Biochemical studies of GFAP have shown MgCl_{2} and/or calcium/calmodulin dependent phosphorylation at various serine or threonine residues by PKC and PKA which are two kinases that are important for the cytoplasmic transduction of signals. These data highlight the importance of GFAP for cell-cell communication.

GFAP has also been shown to be important in repair after CNS injury. More specifically for its role in the formation of glial scars in a multitude of locations throughout the CNS including the eye and brain.

== Clinical significance ==
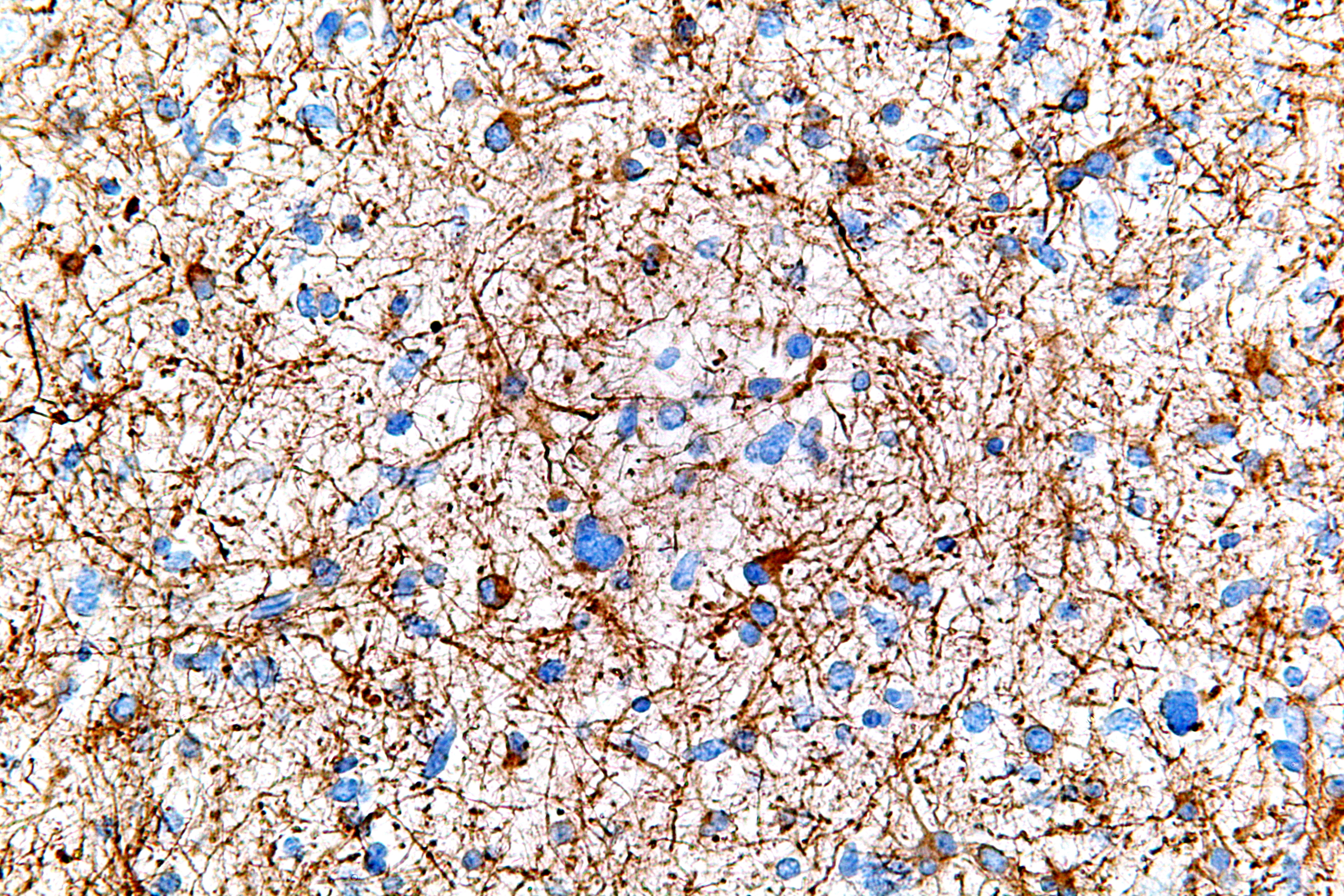
GFAP immunostaining in a glial neoplasm (anaplastic astrocytoma)

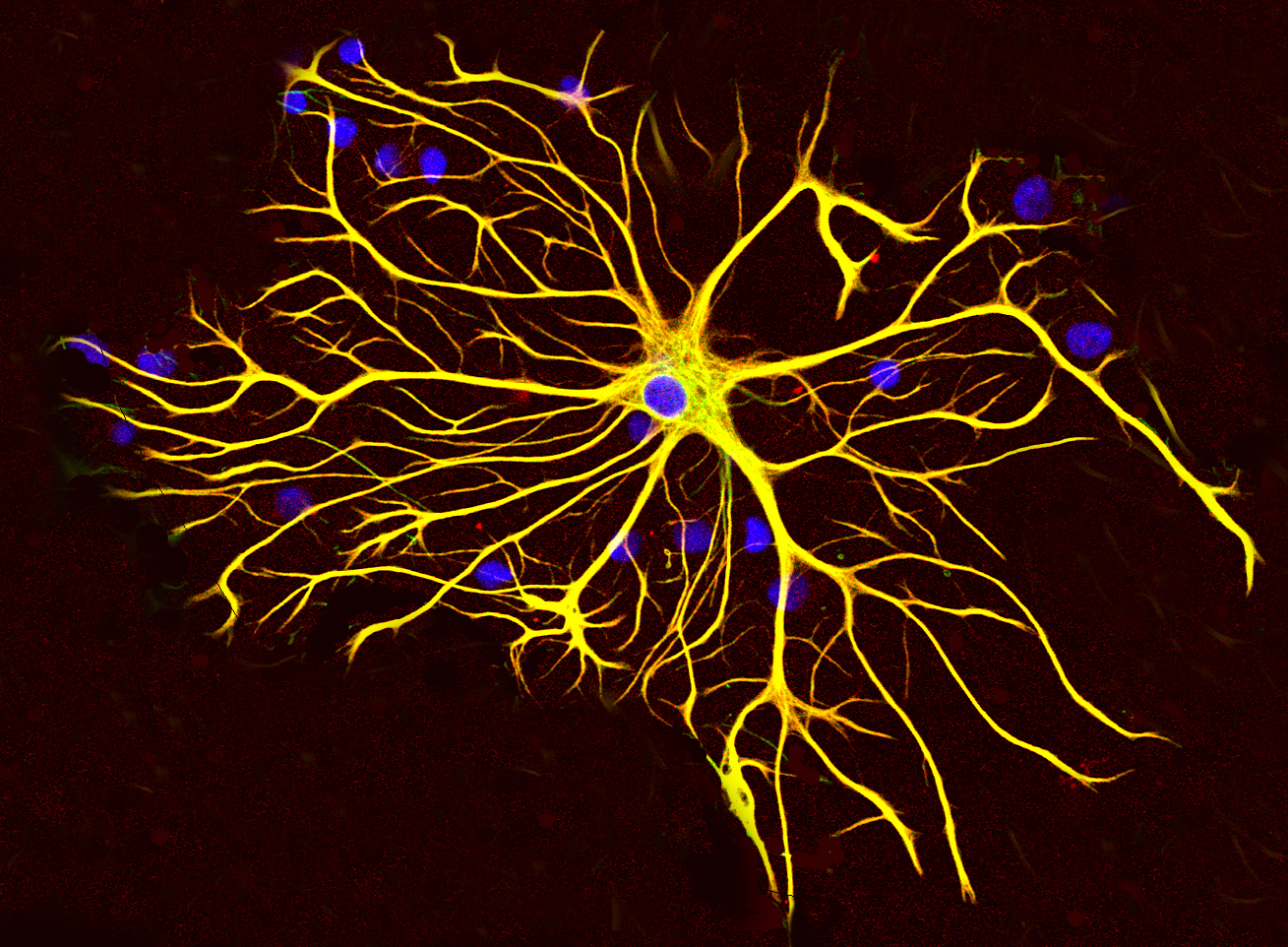
GFAP immunostaining of an astrocyte in cell culture in red and counterstained for vimentin in green. GFAP and vimentin colocalize in cytoplasmic intermediate filaments, so the astrocyte appears yellow. Nuclear DNA is stained blue with DAPI. Antibodies, cell preparation and image generated by EnCor Biotechnology Inc.

There are multiple disorders associated with improper GFAP regulation, and injury can cause glial cells to react in detrimental ways. Glial scarring is a consequence of several neurodegenerative conditions, as well as injury that severs neural material. The scar is formed by astrocytes interacting with fibrous tissue to re-establish the glial margins around the central injury core and is partially caused by up-regulation of GFAP.

Another condition directly related to GFAP is Alexander disease, a rare genetic disorder. Its symptoms include mental and physical retardation, dementia, enlargement of the brain and head, spasticity (stiffness of arms and/or legs), and seizures. The cellular mechanism of the disease is the presence of cytoplasmic accumulations containing GFAP and heat shock proteins, known as Rosenthal fibers. Mutations in the coding region of GFAP have been shown to contribute to the accumulation of Rosenthal fibers. Some of these mutations have been proposed to be detrimental to cytoskeleton formation as well as an increase in caspase 3 activity, which would lead to increased apoptosis of cells with these mutations. GFAP therefore plays an important role in the pathogenesis of Alexander disease.

Notably, the expression of some GFAP isoforms have been reported to decrease in response to acute infection or neurodegeneration. Additionally, reduction in GFAP expression has also been reported in Wernicke's encephalopathy. The HIV-1 viral envelope glycoprotein gp120 can directly inhibit the phosphorylation of GFAP and GFAP levels can be decreased in response to chronic infection with HIV-1, varicella zoster, and pseudorabies. Decreases in GFAP expression have been reported in Down's syndrome, schizophrenia, bipolar disorder and depression.

The generally high abundance of GFAP in the CNS has led to a great interest in GFAP as a blood biomarker of acute injury to the brain and spinal cord in different types of disease mechanisms, such as traumatic brain injury and cerebrovascular disease. After an ischemic stroke, blood levels of GFAP peak after three days and correlates strongly with infarct volume. Elevated blood levels of GFAP are also found in neuroinflammatory diseases, such as multiple sclerosis and neuromyelitis optica, a disease targeting astrocytes. In a study of 22 child patients undergoing extracorporeal membrane oxygenation (ECMO), children with abnormally high levels of GFAP were 13 times more likely to die and 11 times more likely to suffer brain injury than children with normal GFAP levels.

=== Autoimmune astrocytopathy ===
In 2016 a CNS inflammatory disorder associated with anti-GFAP antibodies was described. Patients with autoimmune GFAP astrocytopathy developed meningoencephalomyelitis with inflammation of the meninges, the brain parenchyma, and the spinal cord. About one third of cases were associated with various cancers and many also expressed other CNS autoantibodies.

Meningoencephalitis is the predominant clinical presentation of autoimmune GFAP astrocytopathy in published case series. It also can appear associated with encephalomyelitis and parkinsonism.

== Isoforms ==
Although GFAP alpha is the only isoform which is able to assemble homomerically, GFAP has 8 different isoforms which label distinct subpopulations of astrocytes in the human and rodent brain. These isoforms include GFAP kappa, GFAP +1 and the currently best researched GFAP delta. GFAP delta appears to be linked with neural stem cells (NSCs) and may be involved in migration. GFAP+1 is an antibody which labels two isoforms. Although GFAP+1 positive astrocytes are supposedly not reactive astrocytes, they have a wide variety of morphologies including processes of up to 0.95 mm (seen in the human brain). The expression of GFAP+1 positive astrocytes is linked with old age and the onset of AD pathology.

== Interactions ==
Glial fibrillary acidic protein has been shown to interact with MEN1 and PSEN1.

== See also ==
- 17q21.31 microdeletion syndrome (Koolen–de Vries syndrome)
- GFAP stain
