= Anti-AQP4 disease =

- Other names: Neuromyelitis optica spectrum of diseases

Anti-AQP4 diseases, are a group of diseases characterized by auto-antibodies against aquaporin 4.

After the discovery of anti-AQP4 autoantibody in neuromyelitis optica, it was found that it was also present in some patients with other clinically defined diseases, including multiple sclerosis variants like optic-spinal MS.

The collection of these condition has been named "anti-AQP4 disease" and "neuromyelitis optica spectrum disorders" (NMSD) and they are expected to respond to the same treatments as standard NMO. Some authors propose to use the name "autoimmune aquaporin-4 channelopathy" for these diseases, while others prefer a more generic term "AQP4-astrocytopathy" that includes also problems in AQP4 with a non-autoimmune origin.

== Clinical Spectrum ==
After finding the anti-AQP4 autoantibody in cases outside the standard Devic's disease course, the spectrum was expanded. The spectrum is now believed to consist of:

- Standard Devic's disease, according to the diagnostic criteria described above
- Limited forms of Devic's disease, such as single or recurrent events of longitudinally extensive myelitis, and bilateral simultaneous or recurrent optic neuritis
- optic-spinal MS (OSMS), previously considered a subtype of MS. This variant can present brain lesions like MS, but it should not be confused with an AQP4-negative form of inflammatory demyelinating diseases of the central nervous system spectrum, sometimes called optic-spinal MS.
- Longitudinally extensive myelitis
- Optic neuritis associated with systemic autoimmune disease and with higher AQP4 autoantibody levels
- Optic neuritis or myelitis associated with lesions in specific brain areas such as the hypothalamus, periventricular nucleus, and brainstem
- Tumefactive demyelination: Tumefactive lesions in NMO are not usual, but they have been reported to appear in several cases mistakenly treated with interferon beta.

Devic's disease is currently considered a syndrome more than a disease, presenting an overlapping with the wide spectrum of multiple sclerosis in the form of Optic-Spinal MS.

== Causes ==
The reason for the presence of anti-AQP4 autoantibodies is currently unknown. Some researchers have pointed out that it could be paraneoplastic. It seems also clear that lupus can produce NMO-IgG autoantibodies sometimes, leading to some cases of lupus-derived NMO.

== Diagnosis ==
=== Differential diagnosis ===
AQP4-Ab-negative NMO presents problems for diagnosis. The behavior of the oligoclonal bands respect MS can help to establish a more accurate diagnosis. Oligoclonal bands in NMO are rare and they tend to disappear after the attacks, while in MS they are nearly always present and persistent.

It is important to notice for differential diagnosis that, though uncommon, it is possible to have longitudinal lesions in MS.

Other problem for diagnosis is that AQP4ab in MOGab levels can be too low to be detected. Some additional biomarkers have been proposed.

== Treatment ==
Chemical structure of methylprednisolone, which is used to treat attacks

Currently, there is no cure for Devic's disease, but symptoms can be treated. Some patients recover, but many are left with impairment of vision and limbs, which can be severe.

=== Attacks ===
Attacks are treated with short courses of high dosage intravenous corticosteroids such as methylprednisolone IV.

Plasmapheresis can be an effective treatment when attacks progress or do not respond to corticosteroid treatment. Clinical trials for these treatments contain very small numbers, and most are uncontrolled, though some report high success percentage.

=== Secondary prevention ===
Until recently, no placebo-controlled trials had established the effectiveness of treatments for the prevention of attacks. Most clinicians agree that long term immunosuppression is required to reduce the frequency and severity of attacks. Commonly used immunosuppressant treatments include azathioprine (Imuran) plus prednisone, mycophenolate mofetil plus prednisone, mitoxantrone, intravenous immunoglobulin (IVIG), Rituximab, Soliris and cyclophosphamide.

The disease is known to be auto-antibodies mediated, and (antibody-producing) B-cell depletion has been tried with monoclonal antibodies showing good results. Several other disease modifying therapies are being tried. In 2007, Devic's disease was reported to be responsive to glatiramer acetate and to low-dose corticosteroids. Use of Mycophenolate mofetil is also currently under research.

Hematopoietic stem cell transplantation (HSCT) is sometimes used in severe cases of NMO. Early data suggested that then-practiced forms of HSCT were very effective only in the short term. However, later study data had most patients thriving, with no relapses within 5 years.
