= Thomas Tedder =

American immunologist

Thomas Fletcher Tedder (May 14, 1956 – March 18, 2024) was an American immunologist. He is best known for his work in the fields of B lymphocyte biology and regulation. He was the Alter E. Geller Professor for Research in Immunology at Duke University

== Career ==
Tedder received his Ph.D. in molecular cell biology from the University of Alabama in 1984 and completed his postdoctoral training as a research fellow in pathology at Harvard Medical School. He was a faculty member at Dana–Farber Cancer Institute and Harvard Medical School from 1985 to 1998 before joining Duke University in 1993 as its founding chairman of immunology. Tedder studies the structure and function of B lymphocyte cell surface molecules that regulate B cell function, activation, and signal transduction. He currently has 401 total publications and 25 issued patents relating to B cells and their products, including CD19, CD20, CD22, CD83, and L-selectin. He has founded four biotherapeutic companies, including Angelica Therapeutics, Cellective Therapeutics, Cellective BioTherapy and most recently, Antigenomycs, Inc.

The drug Tedder developed at Cellective Therapeutics, inebilizumab, has now been approved for NMSOD use in the United States under the clinical name Uplizna.

He died on March 18, 2024.
