= Chugai =

Japanese pharmaceutical company

Chugai Pharmaceutical Co., Ltd.

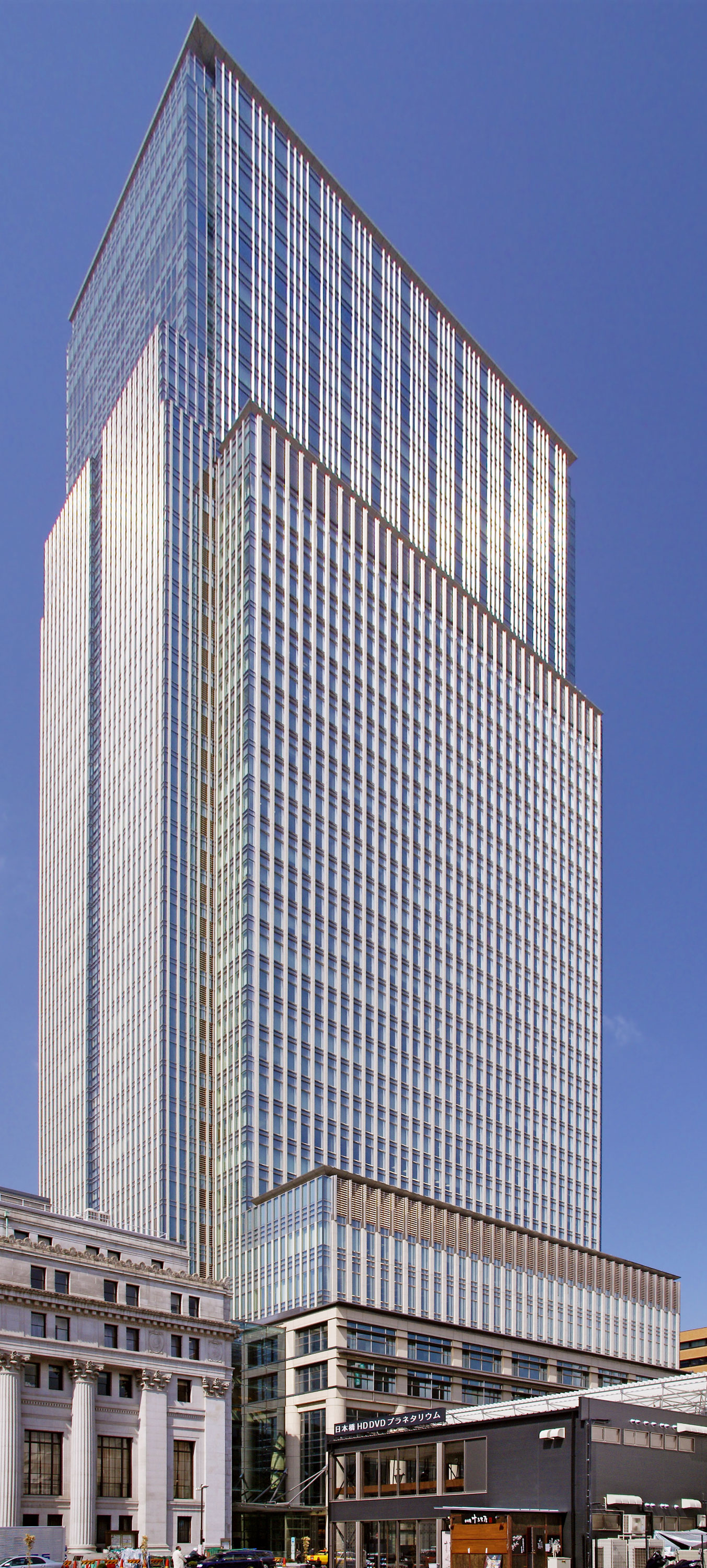
- Headquarters in Nihonbashi Mitsui Tower
- Native name: 中外製薬株式会社
- Romanized name: Chūgai Seiyaku kabushiki gaisha
- Type: Public KK
- Traded as: TYO: 4519; Nikkei 225 component
- Industry: Pharmaceutical Industry, Business import, production and development of drugs for medical sales
- Founded: 8 March 1943; 83 years ago
- Headquarters: Nihonbashi Mitsui Tower, Nihonbashi Muromachi 2-1-1, Chūō, Tokyo; On the registration Headquarter: Tokyo Kita (Tokyo)
- Key people: Osamu Nagayama - Chairman and Tatsuro Kosaka - CEO
- Revenue: 72.9 billion capital of 47 million yen. Standalone sales of 329.2 billion yen and 344.8 billion yen consolidated (December 2007)
- Parent: Hoffmann-La Roche (61.62%)
- Website: www.chugai-pharm.co.jp (in Japanese)

Chugai Pharmaceutical Co., Ltd. (中外製薬株式会社, Chūgai Seiyaku kabushiki gaisha) is a drug manufacturer operating in Japan. It is a subsidiary controlled by Hoffmann-La Roche, which owns 62% of the company as of 30 June 2014. The company is headquartered in Tokyo. Osamu Nagayama is the current representative director and chairman. Tatsuro Kosaka is the current representative director, president and CEO.

== History ==
=== Timeline ===
This is a timeline of important events of Chugai Pharmaceutical.

- 1925: Juzo Ueno founded Chugai Shinyaku Co. Ltd. and started importing and selling medicines
- 1927: Start of the first own production
- 1930: Salobrocanon, an analgesic (pain reliever ) and antipyretic, is launched
- 1937: Calcium bromide production begins
- 1943: Name changed to Chugai Pharmaceutical Co., Ltd. based in Tokyo
- 1944: Acquisition of Matsunaga Pharmaceutical Ltd. and construction of a plant in Matsunaga
- 1945: The headquarters, the factories in Ikebukuro, Sakai and Takada were destroyed in World War II, the headquarters were relocated to Takada, the factory in Takada was rebuilt
- 1946: Construction of the plant in Kamagiishi
- 1951: Guronsan, a drug to detoxify and restore liver function, is launched
- 1952: Varsan, a perspiration insecticide, is launched
- 1955: Chugai became a public company.
- 1956: The stock is listed on the Tokyo Stock Exchange
- 1957: Construction of the Ukima plant
- 1960: Establishment of a research center (Takada Research Laboratory, Tokyo)
- 1967: Foundation of Fukushima Kasai Co Ltd.
- 1961 – Developed patents for synthesis of vitamin A
- 1969: The name of Fukushima Kasai Co Ltd. is changed to Eiko Kasei Co Ltd., after the merger of Fukushima Kasai Co Ltd. and Fukuma Kasau Co. Ltd.
- 1971: Construction of the factory in Fujieda
- 1975: Picibanil, a cancer drug, is launched
- 1982: Opening of a branch in New York
- 1986: Opening of a branch in London
- 1989: Acquisition of Gen-Probe Incorporated (USA)
- 1990: Epogin launched
- 1995 – Released acute promyelocytic sphere of leukemia drug treatment Vesanoid
- 1996 – Released anti-viral chemotherapeutic agent Hivid (HIV reverse transcriptase inhibitor)
- 1997 – Released HIV protease inhibitor Invirase
- 1999 – Released immunosuppressive agent Cellcept
- 2000 – Released antiemetic drug Kytril, developed to combat the side effects of chemotherapy
- 2001 – Produced anti-influenza virus Tamiflu (Roche)
- 2002: Start of the alliance with Roche
- 2003: Xeloda, a cancer drug, is launched
- 2005: Actemra launched
- 2007: Copegus, an antiviral, Avastin, a cancer drug, and Tarceva, a cancer drug launched
- 2011 – Produced Actemra, a human IL-6 receptor monoclonal antibody for rheumatoid arthritis
- 2014: Launch of Kadcyla, a cancer drug, Chugai Pharma China Co Ltd. founded
- 2015 – In March the company announced it would co-commercialise Athersys's stem cell therapy for ischemic strokes in Japan. The deal could yield upwards of US$205 million.
- 2016: Cooperation between Osaka University and Chugai
- 2018: Tecentriq, a cancer drug, is launched
- 2020 – FDA approved satralizumab (Enspryng) for treatment of the orphan disease neuromyelitis optica

== See also ==
- Biotech and pharmaceutical companies in the New York metropolitan area
