= DLEU2 =

Non-coding RNA in the species Homo sapiens

Identifiers
- Aliases: DLEU2, 1B4, BCMSUN, DLB2, LEU2, LINC00022, MIR15AHG, NCRNA00022, RFP2OS, TRIM13OS, deleted in lymphocytic leukemia 2 (non-protein coding)
- External IDs: OMIM: 605766; GeneCards: DLEU2
Orthologs
Databases	NCBI: entry; OMA: entry
Species	Human	Mouse
Entrez	8847	n/a
Ensembl	ENSG00000231607	n/a
UniProt	n a	n/a
RefSeq (mRNA)	n/a	n/a
RefSeq (protein)	n/a	n/a
Location (UCSC)	n/a	n/a
PubMed search		n/a
- Wikidata
View/Edit Human

Deleted in lymphocytic leukemia 2 (non-protein coding) is a long non-coding RNA that in humans is encoded by the DLEU2 gene. In humans it is located on chromosome 13q14. Long non-coding RNAs (lncRNAs) are longer than 200 nucleotides and cannot code for proteins. They can control gene expression, which include transcription, post-transcription, translation, post-translation, and epigenetic changes. lncRNAs can alter the body's processes through transcriptional activation and regulation, transcriptional interference, mRNA translation, and more. Despite its lack of coding ability, it has been observed to present diverse functions in relation to cancer. The DLEU2 gene was originally identified as a potential tumour suppressor gene and is often deleted in patients with B-cell chronic lymphocytic leukemia. It has also been identified as a possible oncogene that promotes lung cancer, hepatocellular carcinoma, and many more, by driving proliferation, migration, and preventing apoptosis of cancerous cells.

Through recent research, it has been established that long non-coding RNAs have the capability to code for micropeptides through small open reading frames (sORFs). Micropeptides are a type of polypeptide with an amino acid length of 100-150aa, and are also known as sORF-encoded peptides or microproteins. Small open reading frames are sequences of DNA that are generally at a length of under 100 codons and which are translated into functional microproteins. Due to their small size and random occurrence, they are difficult to detect in the genome of eukaryotes and prokaryotes. These micropeptides can alter and regulate the growth of cancer cells, human immunity, and metabolism. Through recent research, it has been discovered that the DLEU2 gene can code for a microprotein by the name of Dleu2-17aa. This microprotein is observed in T lymphocytic cells, and directly affects autoimmunity and the inflammatory response in mice.

== Gene ==
Dleu2-17aa is a 17-amino acid microprotein encoded by the first exon of the DLEU2 gene on chromosome 14. A related human micropeptide, Dleu2-25aa, consists of 25 amino acids and is also encoded by the DLEU2 gene. Both micropeptides are translated from the 5′ region of the DLEU2 transcript. Micropeptides are typically named according to their genomic origin.

== Structure ==
Dleu2-17aa is composed of 17 amino acids and lacks an N-terminal signal peptide, resulting in its localization to the cytoplasm following translation. Although thousands of micropeptides encoded by long non-coding RNAs have been predicted, relatively few have been experimentally confirmed to be translated and functionally active, including Dleu2-17aa.

== Function ==
Dleu2-17aa is an immunoregulatory microprotein that contributes to immune homeostasis by promoting the generation of regulatory T cells.

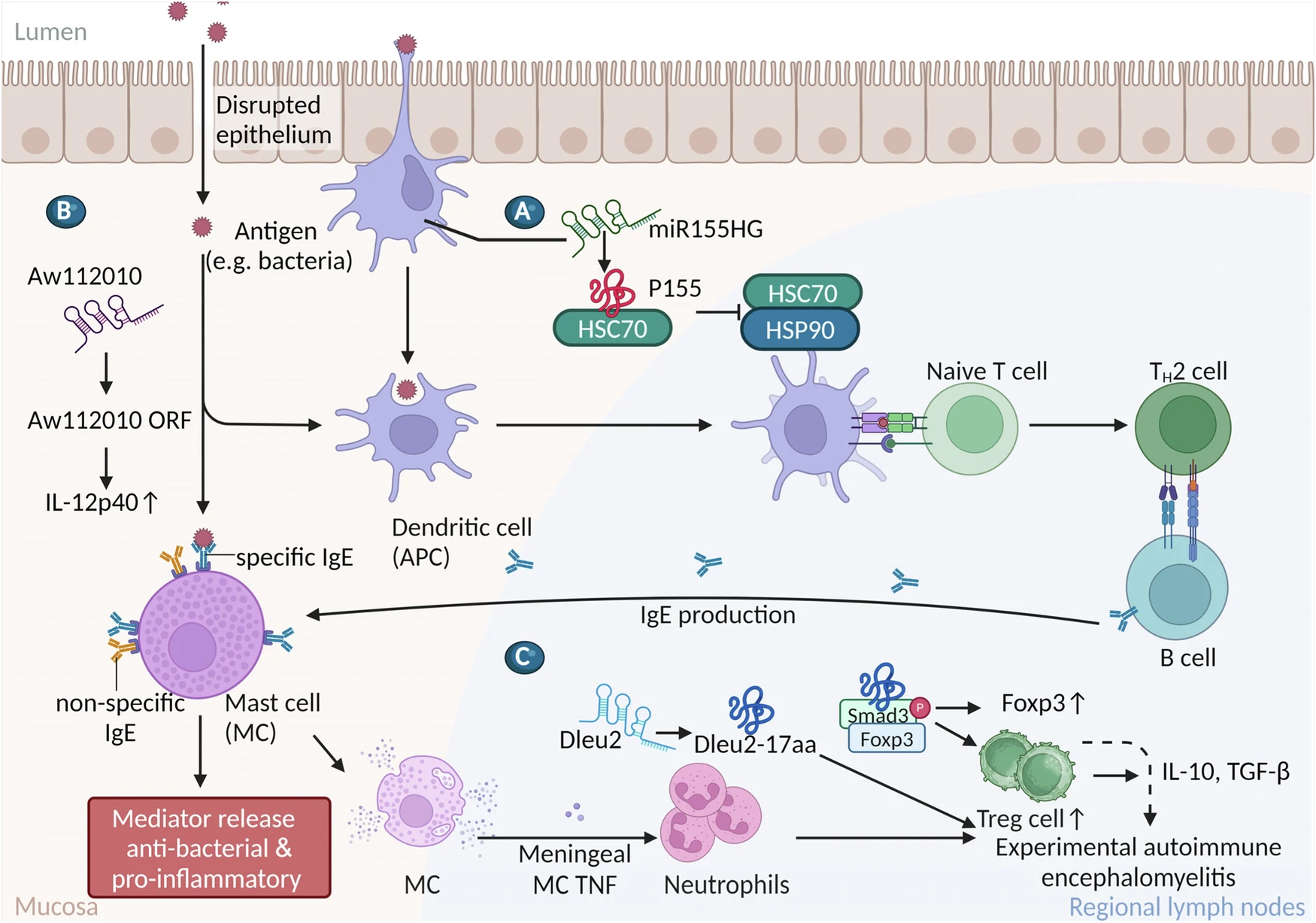
Micropeptides coded by long non-coding RNA in the immune system and an inflammatory response.

Dleu2-17aa interacts with SMAD3 and FOXP3 to enhance regulatory T-cell differentiation, thereby modulating immune responses. In experimental encephalomyelitis, this activity reduces inflammatory responses and decreases disease severity, illustrating the role of Dleu2-17aa as an anti-inflammatory regulator within the immune system.

=== Regulatory T cells ===
The micropeptide Dleu2-17aa is largely observed in CD4^{+} T lymphocytic cells and works to provide an anti-inflammatory response to autoimmune diseases such as encephalomyelitis (EAE). To allow the immune system to work optimally without attacking itself and achieving immunological homeostasis, regulatory T cell (Treg) of the CD4^{+} FOXP3 suppress overactive effector T cell responses. Alternatively, an inefficient number of regulatory T cells impact and have been observed in autoimmune diseases.

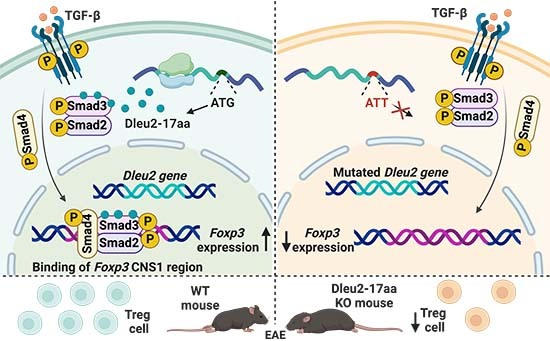
Expression of the micropeptide Dleu2-17aa coded by the DLEU2 gene in CD4+ T cells of mice, and its effect on Foxp3 expression and Treg cell generation

Dleu2-17aa functions by enhancing binding between Smad3 and the Foxp3 CNS1 region, which leads to an increase in FOXP3 expression and generation of new inducible Treg cells. In the expression of Foxp3, the ligand TGF-β (transforming growth factor β) binds to the receptors and activates SMAD2 and SMAD3, covalently bonding to SMAD4 and forming a complex. This bonding allows this group to move into the nucleus, where it binds to the Foxp3 CNS1 region (conserved noncoding DNA sequence 1). Dleu2-17aa interacts with SMAD3 and enhances its binding capability to the FOXP3 CNS1 region. As FOXP3 (Forkhead Box P3) directly impacts the transcription of Treg cells, the enhanced binding caused by Dleu2-17aa increases FOXP3 transcription and expression, and consequently, Treg cell generation. In the image, the mice with a mutated start codon in the DLEU2 gene that cannot code for the Dleu2-17aa microprotein, the Foxp3 expression is lesser than its counterpart, and also has a lower Treg cell count. The lack of Dleu2-17aa in mice showed a worsening of the experimental autoimmune disease encephalomyelitis. Dleu2-17aa functions as an anti-inflammatory response to curb the overactive effector T cell response to the unknown antigen.

== Clinical significance ==
=== As an oncogene ===
DLEU2 has been expressed with varying functionality within the same tumor, and between different tumors as well. Through various studies, it has been determined that DLEU2's expression in cancerous cells is due to the presence of specific genes, or proteins in the tissues of the organism (tissue-specificity). This demonstrates its capability as possible biomarkers for therapeutic and diagnostic measures in different cancers. Different cancer types, variation in individual cancerous cells in a tumor, and transcription copies of the cancerous cells are likely to impact the varied expression of the DLEU2 gene.

Upregulation in cancer is the increased progression of cancerous cells through greater production or the carrying out of biological processes, like gene expression, certain proteins and receptors, and more. It increases the cell's response to specific stimuli which in turn could, for example, decrease the effectiveness of certain drugs and increase the cancerous cell's survivability. Cancers that DLEU2 has shown upregulation in include thyroid cancer, renal clear cell carcinoma (ccRCC), glioma, gastric cancer, pancreatic cancer, non-small cell lung cancer, prostate cancer, endometrial cancer, esophageal cancer, and hepatocellular carcinoma.

Alternatively, DLEU2 is downregulated in certain tumors. Downregulation is the lessened cell responsiveness in part due to the sustained binding of a certain ligand (drug/hormone) to the receptor sites, resulting in quick desensitization of the receptor sites and the ability to effectively transmit signals in cells. Examples of cancers with downregulation include breast cancer, pediatric acute myeloid leukemia, pleomorphic liposarcoma, spindle cell lipoma, and chronic lymphocyte leukemia.

=== As a tumor suppressor gene ===
DLEU2, in the aforementioned cases, was described to work as an oncogene, altering the regulation of receptor proteins and signaling to boost the cancerous cell's survivability. But in the earliest cases in regards to the DLEU2 gene, it was seen to function as a tumor suppressor gene. It is observed in the disease B-cell chronic lymphocytic leukemia (CLL), which is the unregulated abnormal multiplication of B-lymphocytic white blood cells in the bone marrow. Adults of age 65 or greater are generally given this prognosis as it concerns the accumulation of CLL cells over healthy B-cells.

People diagnosed with B-CLL have been observed to also have certain gene mutations that they share with other patients, though the true cause is indeterminable as of now. CD5^{+} monoclonal B-cell lymphocytosis (MBL), which is the presence of increased levels of identical (clonal) B-cell lymphocytes in the blood, have a large portion of these cells displaying a phenotype similar to CLL cells. MBL has been stated to likely develop into chronic lymphocytic leukemia, but the disease progression is not observed in most CLL patients.

Though certain genetic mutations in patients with B-CLL have been observed, a definite cause cannot be conclusively determined. Gene alterations seen in patients include deletion of chromosomal regions 17p, 11q, and 13q14. The deletion of chromosomal region 13q14 is the most commonly observed mutation in 55% of the B-CLL patients. Deletion of 13q14 chromosomal region in patients with a prior case of CD5^{+} MBL are greater than in diseases characterized by CD5^{-} B-cell cancer. The presence of DLEU2 in the deleted chromosomal region of 13q14 originally identifies its role as a tumor suppressor gene as it contains miR-15a/16-1. This cell sequence, through experimentation and analysis in in-vitro studies of non-lymphocytic cells, demonstrates regulation of proliferation and apoptosis of cancerous cells. The deletion of the DLEU2 gene, and miR-15a/16-a sequence, possibly shows a lack of tumor suppressor regulation, leading to the progression of B-cell chronic lymphocytic leukemia.

=== As a biomarker ===
Deleted in lymphocytic leukemia 2 and Dleu2-17aa's presence (and absence) could potentially work as biomarkers for the treatment of cancer and for diagnostic purposes. Abnormality in the expression of the DLEU2 gene has been observed in patients diagnosed with cancers and autoimmune diseases. In cases where the gene DLEU2 functions as an oncogene, DLEU2 expression increases from stage I through IV. Variation in its expression can help diagnose patients, as cells with a varied expression of the gene when compared to normal cells can help locate cancerous cells.

Encephalomyelitis is the increased immune response against the body's antigens and inflammation of the brain and spinal cord. It has been observed that the presence of the Dleu2-17aa microprotein alleviates and lowers the clinical severity of the inflammation of the spinal cord and the destruction of the myelin sheath of the central nervous system, when compared to the effect the FDA-approved drug Copaxone has on patients. The microprotein Dleu2-17aa promotes Treg differentiation, which results in a greater number of regulatory T lymphocytic cells. This helps suppress overreactive immune responses against the body's own antigens and reduces the risk of autoimmune diseases and inflammation. By working as modulators of the immune system and its various processes, the expression of Dleu2-17aa microprotein works as a biomarker to diagnose EAE. They can also function as therapeutic method for alleviating EAE by exogenous means of supplementing Dleu2-17aa to increase Foxp3 expression and Treg cell generation.

== See also ==
- Long non-coding RNA
