= CAR Treg therapy in multiple sclerosis =

Emerging treatment for multiple sclerosis

Multiple sclerosis (MS) is a chronic autoimmune disease affecting the central nervous system (CNS). It is characterized by inflammation, demyelination, and neurodegeneration, leading to significant physical and cognitive impairments. MS is associated with immune dysregulation, including impaired function of regulatory T cells (Tregs), which are essential for maintaining immune balance and self-tolerance within the body. Researchers are investigating the potential of chimeric antigen receptor Tregs (CAR-Tregs). This emerging approach aims to reprogram Tregs to target and control autoreactive immune responses in MS, limiting systemic immunosuppression. Although CAR-Tregs have shown promising results in preclinical studies, challenges remain, including antigen selection, Treg stability, and safety concerns, which currently limit their clinical application.

== Immunopathogenesis of MS ==
Myelin sheath damage in multiple sclerosis

Multiple sclerosis is considered a T-cell-mediated autoimmune disease of the CNS. It causes chronic inflammation, demyelination, gliosis (which results in plaques or scarring), and neuronal damage. This disease disrupts how the brain communicates with the body and can progress in either a relapsing form or a progressive form. While the initial events leading to the disruption of immune tolerance are unknown, patients with MS have myelin-specific autoreactive CD4+ T cells in their peripheral blood and cerebrospinal fluid (CSF), which exhibit an activated memory phenotype and increased expression of adhesion molecules, enhancing their ability to interact with and cross the blood-brain barrier (BBB).

Following activation in the periphery, naïve CD4+ T cells differentiate into proinflammatory subsets, namely Th1 (T helper type 1) cells (secreting interferon γ (IFN-γ), and tumor necrosis factor- α (TNF-α)), and Th17 (T helper type 17) cells (secreting interleukin (IL)-17), which are specialized to drive CNS inflammation. At the same time, this response is counterbalanced by anti-inflammatory Th2 cells (secreting IL-4, IL-5, and IL-10) and Tregs.

This reactivation triggers the release of proinflammatory cytokines and soluble mediators that further disrupt the BBB and stimulate chemotaxis, resulting in a second, larger wave of inflammatory cell recruitment into the CNS. Alongside the CD4+ T cell response, CD8+ cytotoxic T cells can also be found in lesions and directly cause axonal damage, as axons express HLA class I antigens. B cells, initially overlooked, are now seen as vital in the disease process, a role highlighted by the presence of intrathecal IgG synthesis (oligoclonal bands) in a large number of patients.

== Role of regulatory T cells ==
Regulatory T cells are a specialized subpopulation of CD4+ T cells, essential for maintaining homeostasis and self-tolerance by suppressing aberrant immune responses. They are primarily defined by the expression of the transcription factor FOXP3 (forkhead box P3), and the cell surface marker CD25 (IL-2 receptor), which enables them to deprive conventional proinflammatory T cells (Tconv) of the primary cytokine that sustains their proliferation, consequently inducing their apoptosis. Their differentiation occurs primarily in the thymus (natural Tregs), imprinted with TCRs for immune self-tolerance, or peripherally induced Tregs (pTreg) in response to environmental signals such as TGF-β (transforming growth factor beta) presence, preserving immune homeostasis, particularly at barrier sites. Moreover, MS is mainly due to the dysfunction of the pTregs.

Crucially, the hallmark of MS is not necessarily a lack of Tregs but rather a failure of their suppressive function. Multiple studies indicate that although the total number of Tregs in the peripheral blood of individuals with MS might be normal or even slightly elevated, these cells are not very effective at suppressing the growth of autoreactive T cells, especially those responsive to myelin antigens like MOG (Myelin Oligodendrocyte Glycoprotein) and MBP (Myelin Basic Protein).

First, the reduced stability of FOXP3. Studies have shown that FOXP3 expression has been significantly low in MS patients, while other patients may express FOXP3 isoforms that are less efficient at stabilizing the Treg phenotype.

Second, resistance of effector cells, in some cases, the problem mainly lies with the effector T cells becoming resistant to suppression, rendering even functional Tregs ineffective.

Third, the inflammatory milieu in MS further exacerbates this dysfunction; for instance, the long exposure to cytokines like IL-6, IL-1β, and IL-12 makes these cells prone to inflammation and contributes to myelin sheath destruction, which is referred to as lineage instability. Research has also shown that within the CNS, astrocytes can drive T cells to produce high levels of IFN-γ and cholesterol, magnifying inflammation and overwhelming the regulatory capacity of Tregs.

Finally, oxidative and nitrosative stress are critical drivers of Treg failure in MS. Remarkably, the action of peroxynitrite, a powerful reactive nitrogen species, has been shown to nitrate the IL-2 receptor on the surface of Tregs, leading to a disruption in the signaling pathway and promoting a shift towards the pathogenic Th17 cells.

== Chimeric antigen receptor structure ==
Chimeric antigen receptors (CARs) are synthetic transmembrane proteins engineered to redirect immune cells toward specific target antigens.

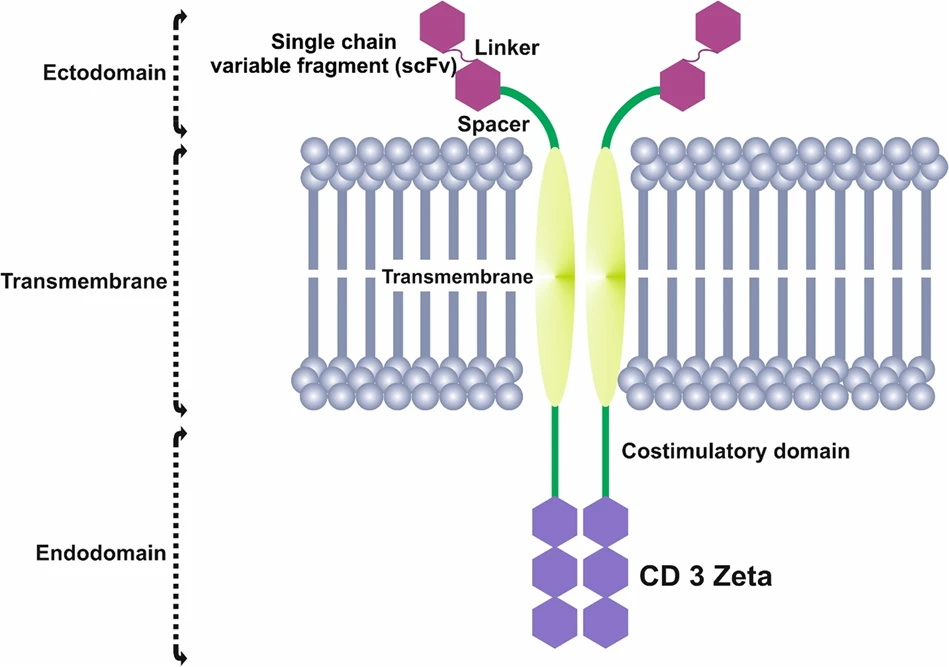
Basic structure of a chimeric antigen receptor (CAR)

Structurally, a typical CAR consists of four main structural components:

- Extracellular antigen-binding domain: a single-chain variable fragment (scFv) derived from an antibody, formed by linking the variable heavy (VH) and variable light (VL) domains of a monoclonal immunoglobulin G (IgG) antibody, to provide antigen specificity and enable MHC-independent antigen recognition.
- Hinge or spacer region: derived from IgG Fc domains or T cell proteins such as CD8α or CD28. It also provides flexibility to access the targeted antigen. Several studies have demonstrated that the optimal spacer length of a given CAR depends on the position of the targeted epitope.
- Transmembrane domain: consists of a hydrophobic α helix that crosses the cell membrane. The main function of the transmembrane is to anchor the CAR in the T cell membrane.
- Intracellular domains: cytoplasmic protein domains located inside the T cell, responsible for transmitting activation signals that mimic those generated by the TCR complex, through the CD3ζ signaling chain.

Subsequent CAR designs have incorporated additional structural features, such as co-stimulatory domains or cytokine release upon activation, and further modifications can enhance the stability of the Treg phenotype.

== Mechanisms ==
Although numerous disease-modifying therapies are approved for MS, their capacity to fully prevent disease progression remains incomplete. The main therapeutic goal in MS is to restore immune tolerance to CNS self-antigens, such as myelin basic protein (MBP), proteolipid protein (PLP), and myelin oligodendrocyte glycoprotein (MOG), through the enhancement and application of cellular immunotherapy. In this context, an autologous cell therapy is suggested. The CAR T cell therapy, initially developed for cancer treatment, was translated to investigate the potential for treating MS by incorporating a CAR into Tregs. CAR‑Tregs are regulatory T cells that have been genetically engineered to express chimeric antigen receptors (CARs). These cells maintain the key features of natural Tregs, including antigen specificity, FOXP3-dependent suppressive activity, and tissue tropism that enables migration to sites of inflammation.

Compared to most Treg therapies, which are polyclonal and suppress the immune system broadly rather than targeting the disease. Antigen-specific Tregs are more effective because they target the harmful immune cells that cause the problem. Some of these are naturally rare or engineered with T cell receptors (TCRs), making them difficult to isolate and expand. CAR-Tregs take this further; they are designed to recognize disease-specific antigens directly independent of MHC recognition, enabling the production of large numbers of targeted, highly potent immunosuppressive cells.

To generate CAR‑Tregs for therapeutic use, scientists introduce a CAR construct into T cells. This can be done by adding the construct to existing Tregs or by engineering conventional CD4+ T cells with both a CAR construct and the FOXP3 gene, which converts them into Tregs. The construct can be delivered using viral or non-viral methods, depending on the protocol.

In the context of MS, one key application involves CAR-Tregs targeting MOG, a protein on the surface of the myelin sheath and a major autoantigen in CNS demyelination. After infusion, MOG-CAR-Tregs migrate to the inflamed CNS tissues, where they encounter their target antigen. The binding of the CAR to MOG activates the Tregs, typically designed with minimal tonic signaling so that activation occurs only in the presence of the target antigen.

When activated, CAR-Tregs initiate a targeted immunosuppressive response. They release anti-inflammatory cytokines such as IL-10 and TGF-β, which help decrease inflammation and promote immune tolerance. Activated CAR-Tregs boost the expression of inhibitory molecules like cytotoxic T lymphocyte-associated protein 4 (CTLA-4). These molecules send suppressive signals to autoreactive effector T cells and limit co-stimulation from antigen-presenting cells (APCs). Furthermore, by increasing the expression of CD25 on their surfaces, CAR‑Tregs consume available IL‑2 and deprive pathogenic T cells of crucial growth signals. These mechanisms enable CAR-Tregs to effectively manage immune responses at sites of inflammation without broadly inhibiting the entire immune system.

== Preclinical translation ==
Preclinical studies using the experimental autoimmune encephalomyelitis (EAE) model have shown the efficacy of CAR-Treg therapy in reducing neuroinflammation and disease severity. In vitro, CAR-Tregs exhibit strong immunosuppressive activity. In vivo, they reduce disease symptoms, prevent relapses, and suppress demyelination. CAR-Tregs engineered to recognize MOG were able to migrate to the CNS after intranasal administration, inhibit autoreactive T cells' proliferation, and reduce the production of proinflammatory cytokines in EAE mice. Overall, these results support CAR-Tregs as a promising therapeutic approach in MS. However, they remain at the preclinical stage, with no proven clinical benefit in humans so far.

== Challenges and limitations ==
Several biological and translational challenges currently hinder the clinical application of CAR Treg therapy. A major obstacle lies in antigen selection, as MS is characterized by a diverse, not fully defined set of autoantigens, whereas CAR constructs are designed to target single surface antigens. This limits the ability to address the full complexity of the disease. Another critical issue is the instability of Tregs. In inflammatory environments, Tregs can lose FOXP3 expression and adopt an effector-like phenotype, thereby compromising their ability to suppress immune responses. Additionally, the effective migration of Tregs to the CNS remains problematic, as these cells have limited ability to cross the BBB, reducing their accumulation at sites of inflammation.

Furthermore, CAR-Tregs often exhibit limited persistence and expansion in vivo due to their dependence on IL-2. This leads to only temporary therapeutic effects. From a manufacturing standpoint, the low frequency, the complexities of their isolation, proliferation, and stable genetic modification, pose significant challenges for large-scale production.

Safety concerns, including risk of systemic immunosuppression and potential loss of regulatory function, raise doubts about the long-term use of CAR-Treg therapy. Finally, most of the supportive evidence for this approach comes from preclinical models, including those using MOG-specific systems. The efficacy and durability of CAR-Treg therapy in human cases of MS, particularly in progressive forms of the disease, remain to be fully established.
