= Osamu Nagayama =

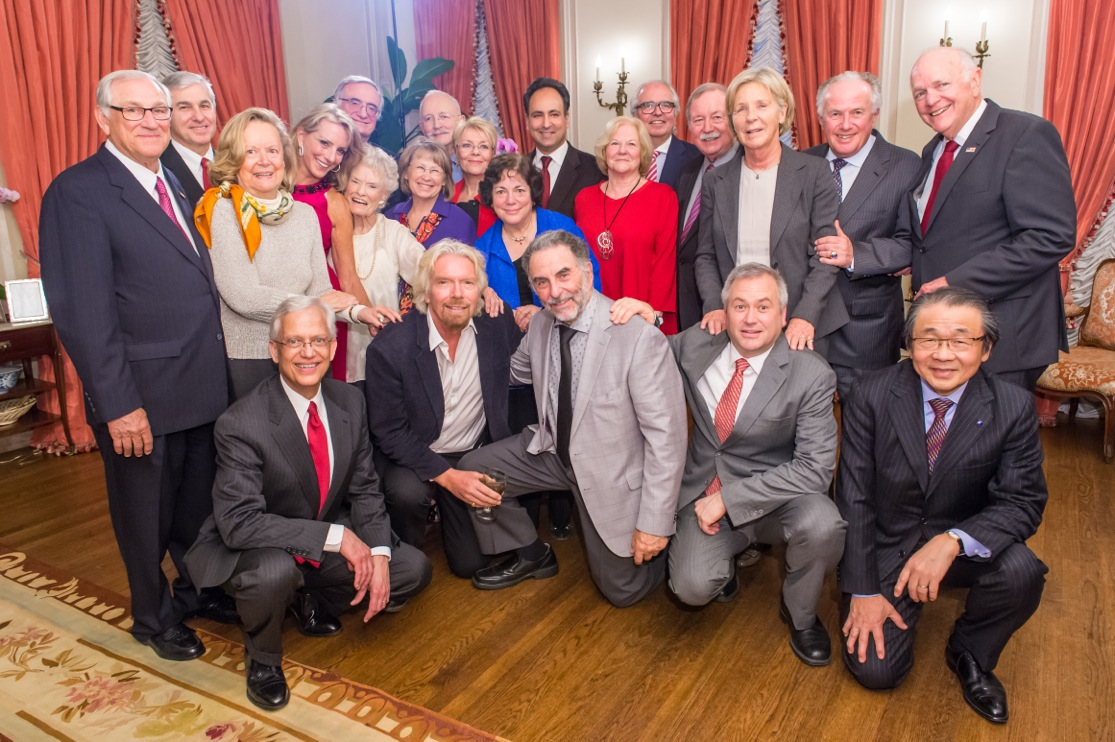
- Osamu Nagayama (lower right) with the Board of Directors of the ICMEC
- Born: April 21, 1947 (age 79)
- Education: Keio University
- Occupations: Chairman and chief executive officer of Chugai Pharmaceutical Co. Chairman of the board of directors, Sony Corporation

Osamu Nagayama (Japanese: 永山 治, Hepburn: Nagayama Osamu; born April 21, 1947) is a Japanese businessman. He was the chairman and chief executive officer of Chugai Pharmaceutical Co., one of Japan's largest drug companies.

He served as chairman of the board of directors of Sony Corporation from 2013 to 2019.

In July 2020, Nagayama was announced as the new chairman of Japanese electronics company Toshiba. In June 2021, Nagayama was ousted from his position as chairman of Toshiba following a shareholder revolt.

Nagayama is Japanese. He obtained his bachelor's degree from Keio University in 1971, where he studied in the Faculty of Business and Commerce. He began his professional career in 1971 at the Long-Term Credit Bank of Japan. He joined Chugai Pharmaceutical Co., Ltd., in November 1978.

Nagayama is a member of the board of directors of the International Centre for Missing & Exploited Children (ICMEC), a global nonprofit organization that combats child sexual exploitation, child pornography, and child abduction.

Preceded by Howard Stringer	Chairman of the Board of Sony Corporation; June 20, 2013–June 18, 2019	Succeeded by Shuzo Sumi
