= Optic-spinal MS =

After the discovery of anti-AQP4 auto-antibodies there are two kinds of Optic-Spinal MS (OSMS):

- Anti-AQP4 positive OSMS or Neuromyelitis optica
- Anti-AQP4 negative OSMS, currently idiopathic, considered inside the Inflammatory demyelinating diseases of the central nervous system spectrum.
