= Myelin oligodendrocyte glycoprotein =

MOG
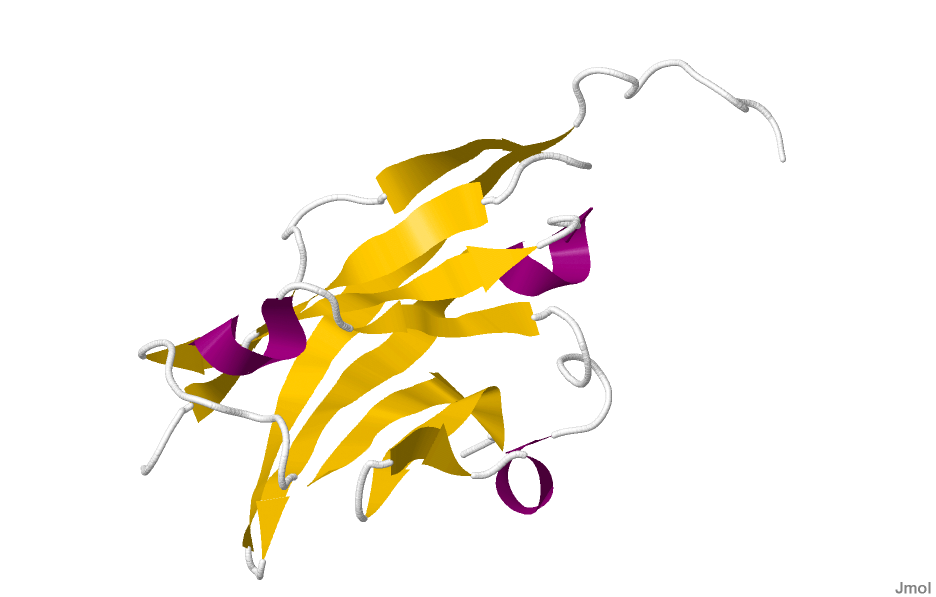

Identifiers
- Aliases: MOG, BTN6, BTNL11, MOGIG2, NRCLP7, myelin oligodendrocyte glycoprotein
- External IDs: OMIM: 159465; MGI: 97435; GeneCards: MOG
Available structures
PDB	Ortholog search: PDBe RCSB
PDB	List of PDB id codes 1Q70

Gene location (Human)
Chr.	Chromosome 6 (human)
Band	6p22.1	Start	29,657,002 bp
Band	6p22.1	End	29,672,372 bp

Gene location (Mouse)
Chr.	Chromosome 17 (mouse)
Band	17 B1|17 19.16 cM	Start	37,321,635 bp
Band	17 B1|17 19.16 cM	End	37,334,290 bp
RNA expression pattern
Bgee	Human / Mouse (ortholog); Top expressed in: C1 segment; substantia nigra; hippocampus proper; putamen; primary visual cortex; temporal lobe; amygdala; caudate nucleus; Brodmann area 9; corpus callosum / Top expressed in: deep cerebellar nuclei; lumbar subsegment of spinal cord; lateral geniculate nucleus; globus pallidus; ventral tegmental area; pontine nuclei; medial geniculate nucleus; central gray substance of midbrain; nucleus of stria terminalis; dorsal tegmental nucleus; More reference expression data
BioGPS	n/a
Gene ontology
Molecular function	virus receptor activity; signaling receptor binding
Cellular component	integral component of membrane; plasma membrane; membrane; external side of plasma membrane
Biological process	central nervous system development; viral entry into host cell; cell adhesion; viral process; regulation of immune response; T cell receptor signaling pathway
Sources:Amigo / QuickGO
Orthologs
Databases	NCBI: entry; OMA: entry
Species	Human	Mouse
Entrez	4340	17441
Ensembl	ENSG00000234096; ENSG00000232641; ENSG00000137345; ENSG00000230885; ENSG00000236561 ENSG00000237834; ENSG00000204655; ENSG00000234623	ENSMUSG00000076439
UniProt	Q16653	Q61885
RefSeq (mRNA)	NM_001008228; NM_001008229; NM_001170418; NM_002433; NM_206809 NM_206810; NM_206811; NM_206812; NM_206813; NM_206814; NM_001363610	NM_010814
RefSeq (protein)	NP_001008229; NP_001008230; NP_001163889; NP_002424; NP_996532 NP_996533; NP_996534; NP_996535; NP_996537; NP_001350539	NP_034944
Location (UCSC)	Chr 6: 29.66 – 29.67 Mb	Chr 17: 37.32 – 37.33 Mb
PubMed search
- Wikidata
View/Edit Human	View/Edit Mouse

Myelin oligodendrocyte glycoprotein (MOG) is a glycoprotein believed to be important in the myelination of nerves in the central nervous system (CNS). In humans this protein is encoded by the MOG gene. It is speculated to serve as a necessary "adhesion molecule" to provide structural integrity to the myelin sheath and is known to develop late on the oligodendrocyte.

== Molecular function ==
While the primary molecular function of MOG is not yet known, its likely role with the myelin sheath is either in sheath "completion and/or maintenance". More specifically, MOG is speculated to be "necessary" as an "adhesion molecule" on the myelin sheath of the CNS to provide the structural integrity of the myelin sheath."

MOG's cDNA coding region in humans have been shown to be "highly homologous" to rats, mice, and bovine, and hence highly conserved. This suggests "an important biological role for this protein".

== Physiology ==
The gene for MOG, found on chromosome 6 p21.3-p22, was first sequenced in 1995. It is a transmembrane protein expressed on the surface of oligodendrocyte cell and on the outermost surface of myelin sheaths. "MOG is a quantitatively minor type I transmembrane protein, and is found exclusively in the CNS. "A single Ig-domain is exposed to the extracellular space" and consequently allows autoantibodies easy access. and therefore is easily accessible to autoantibodies too. The MOG "primary nuclear transcript … is 15,561 nucleotides in length" and, for humans, it has eight exons which are "separated by seven introns". The introns "contain numerous reptitive [sic] DNA" sequences, among which are "14 Alu sequences within 3 introns", and have a range varying from 242 to 6484 bp.

=== Structure ===
Alternatively spliced human mRNA of the MOG gene form at least nine isoforms.

The crystal structure of myelin oligodendrocyte glycoprotein was determined by x-ray diffraction at a resolution of 1.45 Angstroms, using protein from the Norway rat. This protein is 139 residues long, and is a member of the immunoglobulin superfamily. The dssp secondary structure of the protein is 6% helical and 43% beta sheet: there are three short helical segments and ten beta strands. The beta strands are within two antiparallel beta sheets that form an immunoglobulin-like beta-sandwich fold. Several features of the protein structure suggest MOG has a role as an "adhesin in the completion and/or compaction of the myelin sheath." There is a "significant strip" of electronegative charge beginning near the N-terminus and running about half the length of the molecule. Also, MOG was shown to dimerize in solution, and the shape complementarity index is high at the dimer interface, suggesting a "biologically relevant MOG dimer."

=== Synthesis ===
Developmentally, MOG is formed "very late on oligodendrocytes and the myelin sheath".

== Role in disease ==
=== Non-inflammatory demyelinating diseases ===
Interest in MOG has centered on its role in demyelinating diseases. Some of them are not-inflammatory, such as adrenoleukodystrophy, vanishing white matter disease, and Rubella induced intellectual disability.

=== Anti-MOG associated inflammatory demyelinating diseases ===
MOG has received much of its laboratory attention in studies dealing with MS. Several studies have shown a role for antibodies against MOG in the pathogenesis of MS, though most of them were written before the discovery of NMO-IgG and the NMO spectrum of diseases.

Anti-MOG status is different depending whether it is measured by ELISA or by microarray (CBA). The proper way to identify it is by microarray, reacting patient serum with living cells, and detecting the binding IgG via a fluorescent-labeled secondary antibody.

==== In animal models ====
Animal models of MS, namely Experimental Autoimmune Encephalomyelitis (EAE) models, have shown that "MOG-specific EAE models (of different animal strains) display/mirror human multiple sclerosis", but basically explains the part involved in the optic neuritis. These models with anti-MOG antibodies have been investigated extensively and are considered the only antibodies with demyelinating capacity but again, EAE pathology is closer to NMO and ADEM than to the confluent demyelination observed in MS.

Anti-MOG antibodies have been shown to behave similarly to AQP4 antibodies in animal models, and are considered a biomarker against the MS diagnosis

==== In seronegative neuromyelitis optica ====
Anti-MOG autoimmunity has been found to be involved in most AQP4-seronegative NMO and also in optic neuritis and some fulminant forms of ADEM. MOG antibodies in NMOSD are variable depending on the seropositivity status.

==== In other conditions ====
The presence of anti-MOG autoantibodies has been associated with the following conditions

- Most cases of aquaporin-4-seronegative neuromyelitis optica: NMO derived from an antiMOG associated encephalomyelitis,
- Some cases of acute disseminated encephalomyelitis, specially the recurrent ones (MDEM) and the fulminant courses
- Some cases of multiple sclerosis
- isolated optic neuritis or transverse myelitis
