= Inebilizumab =

Monoclonal antibody

Monoclonal antibody
- Type: Whole antibody
- Source: Humanized
- Target: CD19

Clinical data
- Pronunciation: /ɪˌnɛbɪˈlɪzjʊmæb/ ih-NEH-bih-LIZ-yuum-ab
- Trade names: Uplizna
- Other names: inebilizumab-cdon, AMG 335, HZN-551, VIB-551, MEDI-551
- AHFS/Drugs.com: Monograph
- MedlinePlus: a625074
- License data: US DailyMed: Inebilizumab
- Routes of administration: Intravenous
- Drug class: Immunosuppressive drug
- ATC code: L04AG10 (WHO)

Legal status
- Legal status: AU: S4 (Prescription only); CA: ℞-only / Schedule D; US: ℞-only; EU: Rx-only

Identifiers
- CAS Number: 1299440-37-1
- DrugBank: DB12530
- ChemSpider: None
- UNII: 74T7185BMM
- KEGG: D11757

Chemical and physical data
- Formula: C_{6504}H_{10080}N_{1732}O_{2044}S_{44}
- Molar mass: 146652.90 g·mol^{−1}

Inebilizumab, sold under the brand name Uplizna, is a medication used for the treatment of neuromyelitis optica spectrum disorder, immunoglobulin G4-related disease, and generalized myasthenia gravis. Inebilizumab is a humanized monoclonal antibody that binds to and depletes CD19+ B cells including plasmablasts and plasma cells (a CD19-directed cytolytic antibody).

The most common adverse reactions include urinary tract infection, headache, joint pain (arthralgia), nausea and back pain.

Inebilizumab was approved for medical use in the United States in June 2020, in the European Union in April 2022, and in Canada in December 2023. The US Food and Drug Administration considers it to be a first-in-class medication.

== Medical uses ==
Inebilizumab is indicated for the treatment of neuromyelitis optica spectrum disorder in adults who are anti-aquaporin-4 antibody positive; and for the treatment of immunoglobulin G4-related disease in adults.

Neuromyelitis optica spectrum disorder is a rare autoimmune disorder in which immune system cells and autoantibodies attack and damage the optic nerves and spinal cord. Neuromyelitis optica spectrum disorder can be associated with antibodies that bind to a protein called aquaporin-4 (AQP4). Binding of the anti-AQP4 antibody appears to activate other components of the immune system, causing inflammation and damage to the central nervous system. Clinically, the disease is manifested with attacks/relapses that result in neurological impairment such as blindness, paraplegia, sensory loss, bladder dysfunction, and peripheral pain. The disability from each attack is cumulative, making neuromyelitis optica spectrum disorder a chronically debilitating and potentially life-threatening disease.

In April 2025, the US Food and Drug Administration approved inebilizumab as the first treatment for adults living with immunoglobulin G4-related disease, a chronic inflammatory condition that can affect multiple organs.

In September 2025, the Committee for Medicinal Products for Human Use of the European Medicines Agency recommended extending the therapeutic indication of inebilizumab, a medicine used to treat adults with neuromyelitis optica spectrum disorders, to include the treatment of active immunoglobulin G4-related disease, a rare autoimmune disease for which there are no authorized medicines in the EU.

In December 2025, the US FDA approved inebilizumab for adults with generalized myasthenia gravis.

== Side effects ==
The label for inebilizumab includes a warning for infusion reactions, potential depletion of certain proteins (hypogammaglobulinemia), and potential increased risk of infection — including progressive multifocal leukoencephalopathy, and potential reactivation of hepatitis B and tuberculosis.

The most common adverse reactions in the neuromyelitis optica spectrum disorder clinical trial were urinary tract infection, headache, joint pain (arthralgia), nausea and back pain.

Women who are pregnant should not take inebilizumab because it may cause harm to a developing fetus or newborn baby. The FDA advises health care professionals to inform females of reproductive age to use effective contraception during treatment with inebilizumab and for six months after the last dose.

Vaccination with live-attenuated or live vaccines is not recommended during treatment and should be administered at least four weeks prior to initiation of inebilizumab.

== History ==
Inebilizumab was created from the research led by Thomas Tedder at Cellective Therapeutics, and development was continued by Viela Bio and MedImmune.

Inebilizumab was approved for medical use in the United States in June 2020.

The effectiveness of inebilizumab for the treatment of neuromyelitis optica spectrum disorder was demonstrated in a clinical study (NCT02200770) of 230 adult participants that evaluated the efficacy and safety of intravenous inebilizumab. In the trial, 213 of the 230 participants had antibodies against AQP4 (anti-AQP4 antibody positive). During the 197-day study, the risk of an neuromyelitis optica spectrum disorder relapse in the 161 anti-AQP4 antibody positive participants who were treated with inebilizumab was reduced by 77% when compared to the placebo treatment group. There was no evidence of a benefit in participants who were anti-AQP4 antibody negative. The primary efficacy endpoint was the time to the onset of the first adjudicated relapse on or before study day 197 evaluated by a blinded, independent, adjudication committee, who determined whether the attack met protocol-defined criteria. The trial was conducted at 82 sites in 24 countries (including the United States) in North and South America, Europe, Africa, Asia and Australia.

The US Food and Drug Administration granted the application for inebilizumab orphan drug designation and granted approval of Uplizna to Viela Bio.

== Society and culture ==
=== Legal status ===
Inebilizumab was approved for medical use in the United States in June 2020.

Inebilizumab was authorized for medical use in the European Union in April 2022, and in Canada in December 2023.

=== Names ===
Inebilizumab is the international nonproprietary name and the United States Adopted Name.
