= Eugène Devic =

French neurologist (1858–1930)

Eugène Devic (October 24, 1858 – 1930) was a French neurologist who was a native of Lyon.

He studied medicine in Lyon under internist Léon Bouveret (1850-1929). Later he was associated with the "Hôpital de la Croix-Rousse" and the "Hôtel-Dieu de Lyon".

Devic performed research of numerous neurological disorders, including infantile chorea, cerebral glioma and tumors of the corpus callosum. He was also involved with studies of typhoid fever and mental aspects associated with the disease.

In 1894 Devic and his student Fernand Gault described a rare nervous condition that affected the spinal cord and optic nerves that resembled multiple sclerosis. Today this disorder is referred to as Devic's disease or neuromyelitis optica (NMO).
