= Aquaporin-4 =

Protein-coding gene in the species Homo sapiens

AQP4
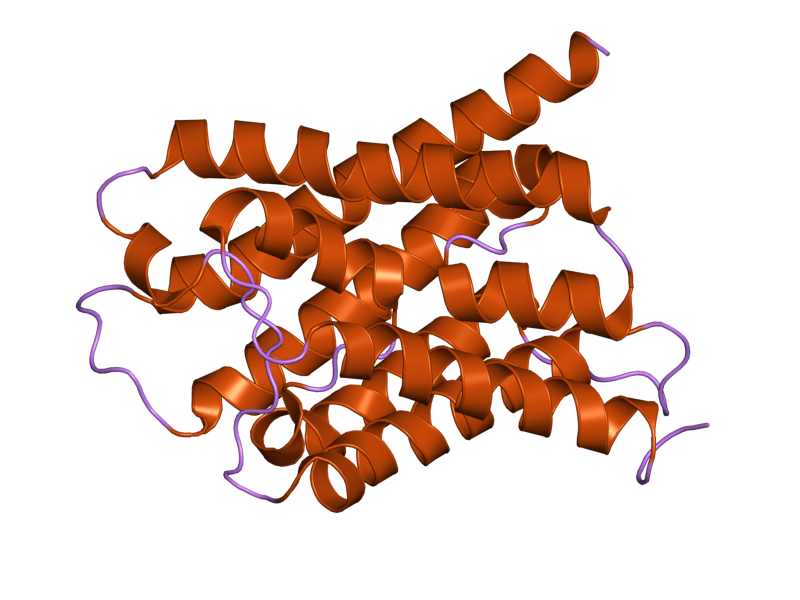

Identifiers
- Aliases: AQP4, aquaporin 4, HMIWC2, MIWC, WCH4, hAQP4
- External IDs: OMIM: 600308; MGI: 107387; GeneCards: AQP4
Available structures
PDB	Ortholog search: PDBe RCSB
PDB	List of PDB id codes 3GD8

Gene location (Human)
Chr.	Chromosome 18 (human)
Band	18q11.2	Start	26,852,043 bp
Band	18q11.2	End	26,865,771 bp

Gene location (Mouse)
Chr.	Chromosome 18 (mouse)
Band	18 A1|18 8.74 cM	Start	15,522,553 bp
Band	18 A1|18 8.74 cM	End	15,544,039 bp
RNA expression pattern
Bgee	Human / Mouse (ortholog); Top expressed in: external globus pallidus; pars reticulata; pars compacta; superior vestibular nucleus; subthalamic nucleus; ventral tegmental area; internal globus pallidus; inferior ganglion of vagus nerve; lower lobe of lung; corpus callosum / Top expressed in: pontine nuclei; habenula; olfactory epithelium; cerebellar vermis; deep cerebellar nuclei; lobe of cerebellum; medial vestibular nucleus; dorsal tegmental nucleus; superior colliculus; medial geniculate nucleus; More reference expression data
BioGPS	n/a
Gene ontology
Molecular function	water channel activity; water transmembrane transporter activity; protein binding; identical protein binding; channel activity
Cellular component	cytoplasm; integral component of membrane; plasma membrane; basolateral plasma membrane; membrane; external side of plasma membrane; integral component of plasma membrane; sarcolemma; astrocyte end-foot; extracellular region; endosome; endosome membrane; cell projection
Biological process	water transport; ion transmembrane transport; multicellular organismal water homeostasis; renal water homeostasis; cellular response to interferon-gamma; transmembrane transport; cellular water homeostasis; water homeostasis; protein homotetramerization; cerebrospinal fluid circulation
Sources:Amigo / QuickGO
Orthologs
Databases	NCBI: entry; OMA: entry
Species	Human	Mouse
Entrez	361	11829
Ensembl	ENSG00000171885	ENSMUSG00000024411
UniProt	P55087	P55088
RefSeq (mRNA)	NM_001650; NM_004028; NM_001317384; NM_001317387; NM_001364286 NM_001364287; NM_001364289	NM_009700; NM_001308641; NM_001308642; NM_001308643; NM_001308644 NM_001308645; NM_001308646; NM_001308647; NM_001317729
RefSeq (protein)	NP_001304313; NP_001304316; NP_001641; NP_004019; NP_001351215 NP_001351216; NP_001351218	NP_001295570; NP_001295571; NP_001295572; NP_001295573; NP_001295574 NP_001295575; NP_001295576; NP_001304658; NP_033830
Location (UCSC)	Chr 18: 26.85 – 26.87 Mb	Chr 18: 15.52 – 15.54 Mb
PubMed search
- Wikidata
View/Edit Human	View/Edit Mouse

Secondary (A), Tertiary (B), and Quaternary (C) depictions of an aquaporin channel

Aquaporin-4, also known as AQP-4, is a water channel protein encoded by the AQP4 gene in humans. AQP-4 belongs to the aquaporin family of integral membrane proteins that conduct water through the cell membrane. A limited number of aquaporins are found within the central nervous system (CNS): AQP1, 3, 4, 5, 8, 9, and 11, but more exclusive representation of AQP1, 4, and 9 are found in the brain and spinal cord. AQP4 shows the largest presence in the cerebellum and spinal cord grey matter. In the CNS, AQP4 is the most prevalent aquaporin channel, specifically located at the perimicrovessel astrocyte foot processes, glia limitans, and ependyma. In addition, this channel is commonly found facilitating water movement near cerebrospinal fluid and vasculature.

Aquaporin-4 was first identified in 1986. It was the first evidence of the existence of water transport channels. The method that was used to discover the existence of the transport channels was through knockout experiments. With this technique they were able to show the significant role of AQP4 in CNS injuries and brain water imbalances. In 1994 the channel was successfully cloned and initially named Mercury-Insensitive Water Channel.

== Structure ==
The structure of AQP4 consists of six-transmembrane domains and five connecting loops to form the channel. Through x-ray crystallography, it was found that "each AQP4 monomer consists of six helical, membrane-spanning domains and two short helical segments surrounding a narrow aqueous pore". At the narrowest point the aqueous pore measures 2.8 angstroms, just large enough for the single-file passage of water molecules. While each monomer is individually capable of water transport, the quaternary structure of the channel is a tetramer. The assembly of AQP4 monomers into tetramers is similar to other aquaporin channels. In addition, AQP4 has two distinct structural isoforms located in the CNS: M1 and M23. Both form homo- and hetero-tetramers that are permeable to water. M23 isoforms are larger square arrays in the endfoot membranes of astrocytes compared to M1 isoforms, which are smaller and more unstable. The aquaporin-4 tetramers accumulate to transform into orthogonal arrays of particle (OAPs) in the cell plasma membrane.

== Tissue and cellular distribution ==
Aquaporin-4 is the most common aquaporin in the brain, spinal cord, and optic nerve. It is highly expressed in the human body primarily at the end-feet of astrocytes. Additionally, AQP4 can also be located in epithelial cells of many organs throughout the human body, such as the kidney, intestine, salivary glands, sensory organs, and skeletal muscles. In these specific cases of epithelial cell expression, AQP4 is concentrated within the basolateral membrane layer of these locations.

Furthermore, AQP4 also plays a role in the supportive cells of sensory organs, such as the retina, inner ear, and olfactory epithelium. Within the retina, AQP4 is highly concentrated where the processes of Müller cells have a basal lamina around blood vessels and inner limiting membrane and to a lesser degree in the inner and outer plexiform layers.

AQP4 is also expressed in astrocytes and is upregulated by direct insult to the central nervous system. Specifically within the central nervous system (CNS), AQP4 can be found along the spinal cord and serves as the main water channel. The AQP4 channels are highly concentrated in the blood-brain barrier (BBB), as well as in other cerebrospinal fluid barriers.

In the kidneys, AQP4 is primarily found in the inner medulla, and shows little to no presence in the outer medulla and cortex. It is constitutively expressed in the basolateral cell membrane of principal collecting duct cells and provide a pathway for water to exit these cells.

== Function ==
Aquaporin-4's overall function is to provide fast water transportation as well as maintain homeostatic balance within the central nervous system. This channel can transport water up to speeds of 3 × 10^{9} molecules per second. It is the primary water channel protein that reconciles the homeostasis of water in the CNS. AQP4 may be involved in a variety of physiological processes such as waste removal (glymphatic system) and fine-tuning of potassium homeostasis. Water flowing into and out of the brain or spinal cord is assisted by AQP4. Here, AQP4 channels respond passively to osmotic gradients. In addition, they play a role in brain water transport, cell migration, brain edema, metabolism and cell homeostasis.

Other systems are also regulated by AQP4. Within the inner ear, the main role is to provide osmotic balance in supporting epithelium cells within the organ of Corti by recycling K^{+}. Another specific role AQP4 plays is to help odorant molecules bind to target receptors and binding proteins within olfactory epithelium. Within the retina, the role of AQP-4 is to maintain homeostasis. Aquaporin-4 is essential in the formation of memory as well as synaptic plasticity. Other performances that aquaporin-4 is involved in are synaptic plasticity, astrocyte migration, regulation of extracellular space volume, and the homeostasis of potassium.

== Clinical significance ==
Loss-of-function mutations in AQP4 have been identified as a very rare cause of the leukodystrophy Megalencephalic Leukoencephalopathy with subcortical Cysts (MLC). Two patients have been reported to date, both presenting with early-onset macrocephaly, mild motor developmental delay, epilepsy and slowly progressive ataxia. Brain MRI showed diffuse white matter abnormalities and subcortical cysts. These findings confirm the critical role of Aquaporin-4 as an essential channel for brain water homeostasis and white matter integrity.

The condition known as neuromyelitis optica, NMO, is a rare demyelinating, inflammatory disorder of the CNS that primarily affects the optic nerves and spinal cord of individuals. Aquaporin-4 is the predominant autoimmune target in 2/3 neuromyelitis optica and higher AQP4 autoantibody levels are associated with the occurrence of optic neuritis (ON), however serum AQP4-IgG titer only moderately reflects disease activity, severity, or neurological prognosis. Specific AQP4 IgG autoantibody, or NMO-IgG, binds to the extracellular surface of AQP4. This binding provides an opening for the development of targeted therapeutics in NMO. Therapy options are immunosuppression, such as corticosteroids and azathioprine immunosuppressive drugs, immunomodulation, and plasma exchange. A recent serum antibody (anti-AQP4) has been detected for patients with NMO, which is currently used to diagnose this condition.

Other clinical significant implications of AQP4 in the human body is the role in the regulation of cerebrospinal fluid (CSF) in the ventricles. Within the ventricles of the brain, AQP4 can be utilized in the removal of excess CSF in conditions such as hydrocephaly. The primary treatment for individuals with hydrocephaly is through the implementation of mechanical shunts into the ventricles to drain the excess fluid. With further research into the role of AQP4, it may be possible to modify the human body's system of upregulation of these channels to help in the reabsorption of CSF without the need to use physically invasive treatments.

Aquaporin-4 is also implicated in brain and spinal edema that occurs after a stroke or traumatic injury; AQP4 facilitates both water accumulation in cytotoxic edema, and fluid clearance in vasogenic edema; in experimental settings involving mice, this contributes to worse or better clinical outcomes, respectively. This dual role suggests that the timing and type of AQP4 modulation are critical for treating ischemic stroke and traumatic brain injury.

== Research ==
Based on work in animal models, aquaporin-4 may have a role in several other diseases including Alzheimer's disease, amyotrophic lateral sclerosis, Parkinson's disease, multiple sclerosis, and epilepsy, and appears to have a role in pathological response to traumatic brain injury and stroke.

In rodent models, AQP4 appears plays a role in both the development and resolution of the cerebral edema that occurs following an injury like TBI or stroke and around brain tumors. In comparison with wild-type mice, double knockout mice exhibited different diseases course post brain injury. It indicated reduced intracranial pressure, cell death, water accumulation, astrogliosis, and lesion volume. The expression of aquaporin 4 is reliant on the disease stage of TBI. In an acute stage of TBI, the lack of aquaporin 4 causes a decrease of excess water removal while for later stage TBI results in prevention of severe damage and swelling.

In people who suffer from Alzheimer's disease, amyloid plaques sometimes develop in brain arteries—a condition is referred to as cerebral amyloid angiopathy, or CAA. Animal studies have found that the severity of CAA increases or decreases depending on aquaporin-4 expression. When there is a decrease in AQP4, CAA severity increases and vice versa; it is not known what causes changes in AQP4 expression levels, nor whether this is part of the disease process or an effort of the brain to adapt. In animal models of amyotrophic lateral sclerosis, AQP4 is overexpressed in the brainstem, cortex, and gray matter of the spinal cord which results in swollen astrocytes; the reason for this is not understood.

Knockout mice display cognition problems; there is disruption in memory consolidation as well as disruption between memory acquisition, spatial recognition, and memory of where an object was after it has been moved.
