= Encephalomyelitis =

Inflammation of the brain and spinal cord

- Specialty: Neurology

Encephalomyelitis is inflammation of the brain and spinal cord. Various types of encephalomyelitis include:

- Acute disseminated encephalomyelitis or postinfectious encephalomyelitis, a demyelinating disease of the brain and spinal cord, possibly triggered by viral infection.
- Encephalomyelitis disseminata, a synonym for multiple sclerosis.
- AntiMOG associated encephalomyelitis, one of the underlying conditions for the phenotype neuromyelitis optica and in general all the spectrum of MOG autoantibody-associated demyelinating diseases.
- Eastern equine encephalitis, Japanese encephalitis, Venezuelan equine encephalitis, and Western equine encephalitis: a group of viral illnesses that can affect horses and humans; collectively termed Equine encephalitis.
- Experimental autoimmune encephalomyelitis (EAE), an animal model of brain inflammation.
- Progressive encephalomyelitis with rigidity and myoclonus (PERM) – A kind of stiff person syndrome.
- AIDS-related encephalomyelitis, caused by opportunistic Human T-lymphotropic virus type III (HTLV-III) infection.
- Myalgic encephalomyelitis/chronic fatigue syndrome, a disabling chronic illness
