= Tripartite synapse =

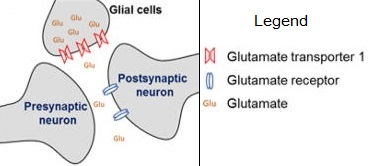
Tripartite Synapse: Presynaptic neuron, Postsynaptic neuron, and Glial cells

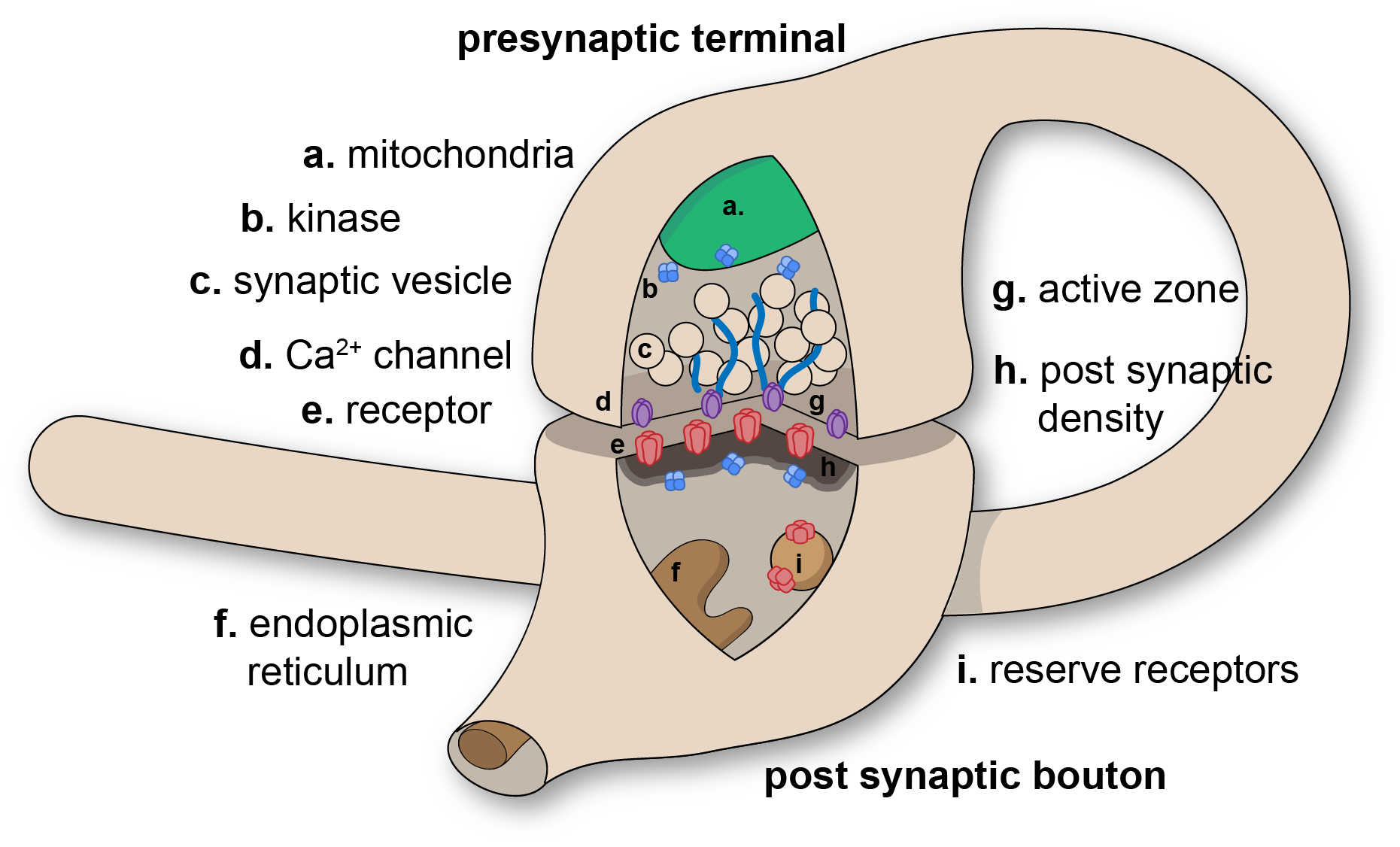
Presynaptic and postsynaptic neuron

Tripartite synapse refers to the functional integration and physical proximity of:

- The presynaptic membrane,
- Postsynaptic membrane,
- and their intimate association with surrounding glia.

It also refers as well as the combined contributions of these three synaptic components to the production of activity at the chemical synapse. Tripartite synapses occur at a number of locations in the central nervous system with astrocytes, a type of glial cell, and may also exist with Muller glia of retinal ganglion cells and Schwann cells at the neuromuscular junction. The term was first introduced in the late 1990s to account for a growing body of evidence that glia are not merely passive neuronal support cells but, instead, play an active role in the integration of synaptic information through bidirectional communication with the neuronal components of the synapse as mediated by neurotransmitters and gliotransmitters.

== Evidence of the Tripartite Synapse ==
Evidence for the role of astrocytes in the integration and processing of synaptic integration presents itself in a number of ways:

- Astrocytes are excitable cells: In response to stimuli from any of the three components of the tripartite synapse, astrocytes are capable of producing transient changes in their intracellular calcium concentrations through release of calcium stores from the endoplasmic reticulum
- Astrocytes communicate bidirectionally with neurons: Through changes in their calcium concentration excitability, astrocytes are able to detect neurotransmitters and other signals released from neurons at the synapse and can release their own neurotransmitters or gliotransmitters that are, in turn, capable of modifying the electrophysiological excitability of neurons.
- Astrocytes are capable of responding selectively to stimuli: Astrocytes of the hippocampal stratum oriens form tripartite synapses with axonal projections from the alveus. The alveus projections can form either glutamatergic or cholinergic synapses with the stratum oriens, but the astrocytes of this region respond with changes in calcium concentration only to cholinergic activation of alveus projections. This is not merely due to a sensitivity of these astrocytes exclusive to acetylcholine, as they will also respond to glutamatergic synaptic activity originating from a different brain region, the Schaffer collateral.
- Astrocytes integrate and modulate information from their synaptic inputs: Astrocytic calcium concentration changes in response to simultaneous stimulation by two neurotransmitter types is not always a linear summation (a linear summation being an increase in intracellular calcium concentration in the astrocyte in response to two simultaneous stimuli that would be the equivalent of adding the calcium concentration changes that would occur in response to each stimulation individually) of the effects of each individual input but varies by the transmitter combinations as well as frequency of stimulation. The hippocampal stratum oriens astrocytes, which respond to synaptic activity from glutamatergic neurons originating in the Schaffer collateral and cholinergic neurons originating in the alveus, produce changes in their intracellular calcium concentrations that is non-linear with the strength of synaptic input. Additionally, these same stimuli are capable of producing either a potentiated calcium concentration response at low frequencies of stimulation or a depressed calcium concentration response at high frequencies of stimulation.

== Differences between young and adult brain ==
In a 2013 published research study titled Glutamate-Dependent Neuroglial Calcium Signaling Differ Between Young and Adult Brain, it was found that the tripartite synapse is not found in the adult brain. Earlier published research had discussed how astrocytes had metabotropic glutamate receptor 5 (mGluR5)–dependent increases in cytosolic calcium ions (Ca2+). However, astrocytic expression of mGluR5 was lost by the third postnatal week in mice and was not present in human cortical astrocytes. The results of the study indicate that neuroglial signaling the adult brain may be fundamentally different than the young brain.

Maiken Nedergaard, M.D., D.M.Sc., lead author of the study and co-director of the University of Rochester Medical Center (URMC) Center for Translational Neuromedicine stated:

If this concept was correct, it should have given rise to a clinical trial by now. It has not, which tells us that with so many labs work on this for 20 years that there must be something wrong.

She also stated that:

Our findings demonstrate that the tripartite synaptic model is incorrect. This concept does not represent the process for transmitting signals between neurons in the brain beyond the developmental stage.

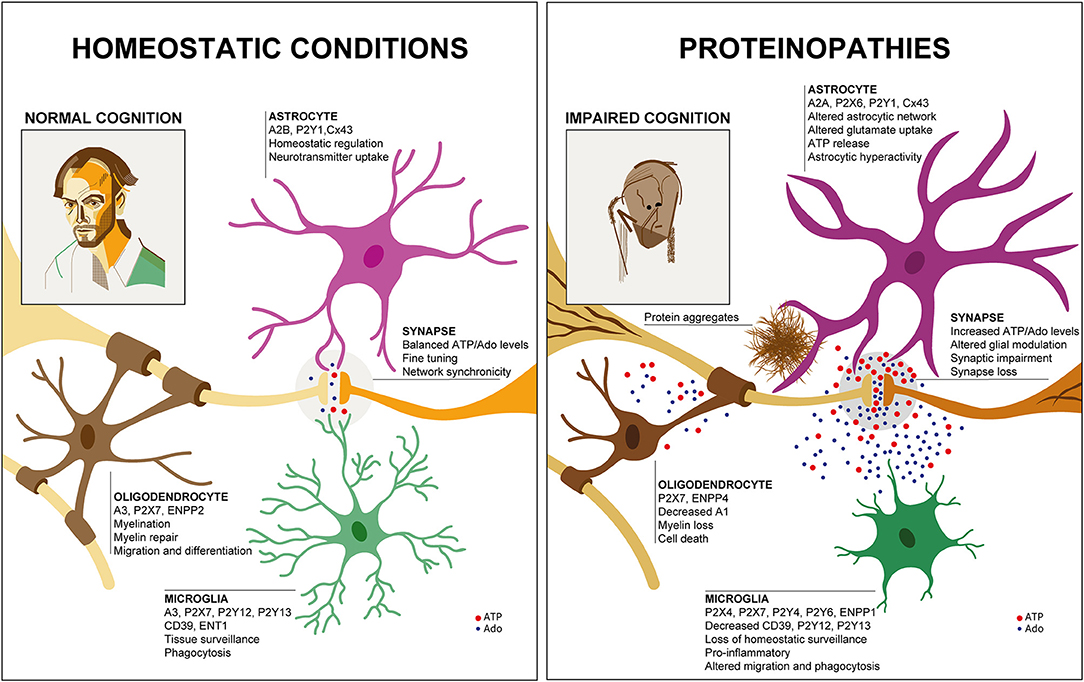
Glial purinergic signaling. The astrocyte is a glial cell.

In collaboration with the University of Rochester’s Institute of Optics, Nedergaard and her team had developed a new 2-photon microscope that had allowed researchers to observe glia activity in the living brain, which allowed observable data for the study.

However, a trio of studies published in Science in 2025 demonstrated that astrocytes in adult fruit flies, zebrafish, and mice actively modulate neuronal signaling through a norepinephrine (NE)-triggered pathway in which astrocytic calcium buildup leads to the release of ATP and adenosine, suggesting that while mGluR5-dependent glutamate signaling may indeed be absent in the mature brain, astrocytes participate in adult synaptic modulation through alternative molecular mechanisms. These findings indicate a role for astroglial purinergic signaling axis for norepinephrine (NE) "mediated behavioral and brain state transitions" and position for "astroglia as important effectors in neuromodulatory signaling".
