= Brain cell =

Functional tissue of the brain

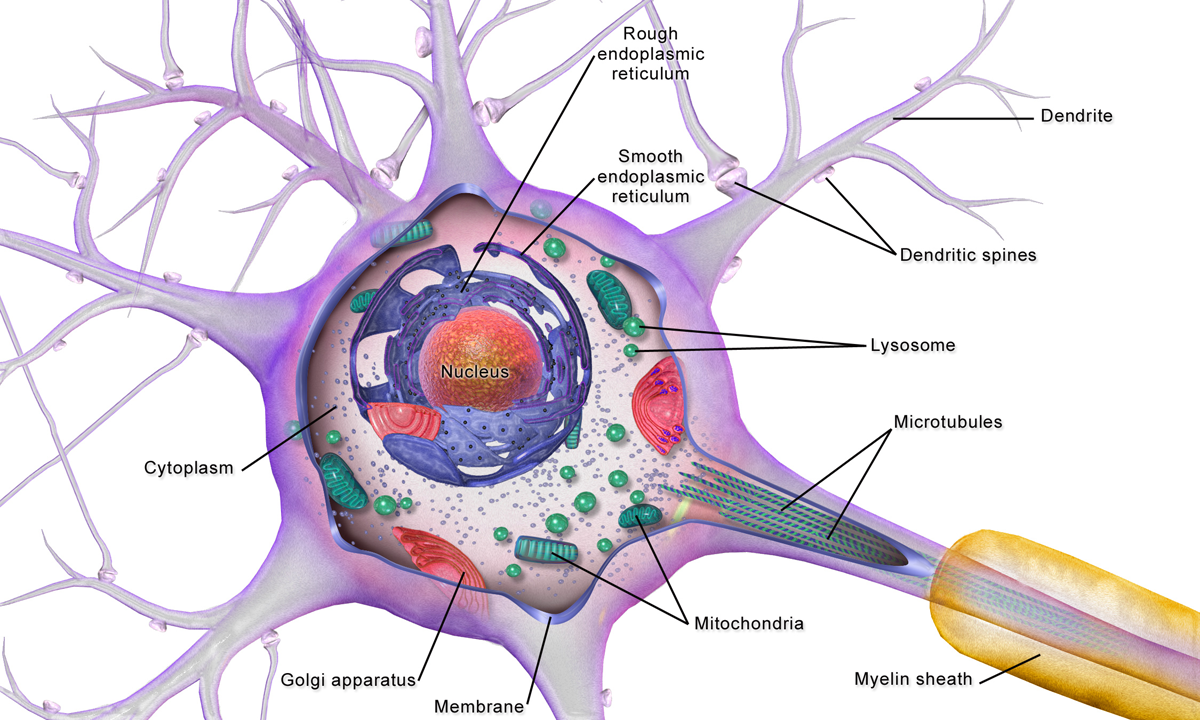
- Illustration of a neuron, microtubules shown as they enter the axon, and seen enclosed in a myelin sheath.

Brain cells make up the functional tissue of the brain. The rest of the brain tissue is the structural stroma that includes connective tissue such as the meninges, blood vessels, and ducts. The two main types of cells in the brain are neurons, also known as nerve cells, and glial cells, also known as neuroglia. There are many types of neuron, and several types of glial cell.

Neurons are the excitable cells of the brain that function by communicating with other neurons and interneurons (via synapses), in neural circuits and larger brain networks. The two main neuronal classes in the cerebral cortex are excitatory projection neurons (around 70-80%) and inhibitory interneurons (around 20–30%). Neurons are often grouped into a cluster known as a nucleus where they usually have roughly similar connections and functions. Nuclei are connected to other nuclei by tracts of white matter.

Glia are the supporting cells of the neurons and have many functions of which not all are clearly understood, but include providing support and nutrients to the neurons. Glia are grouped into macroglia—astrocytes, ependymal cells, and oligodendrocytes, and much smaller microglia which are the macrophages of the central nervous system. Astrocytes are capable of communication with neurons involving a signaling process similar to neurotransmission, called gliotransmission.

== Cell types ==
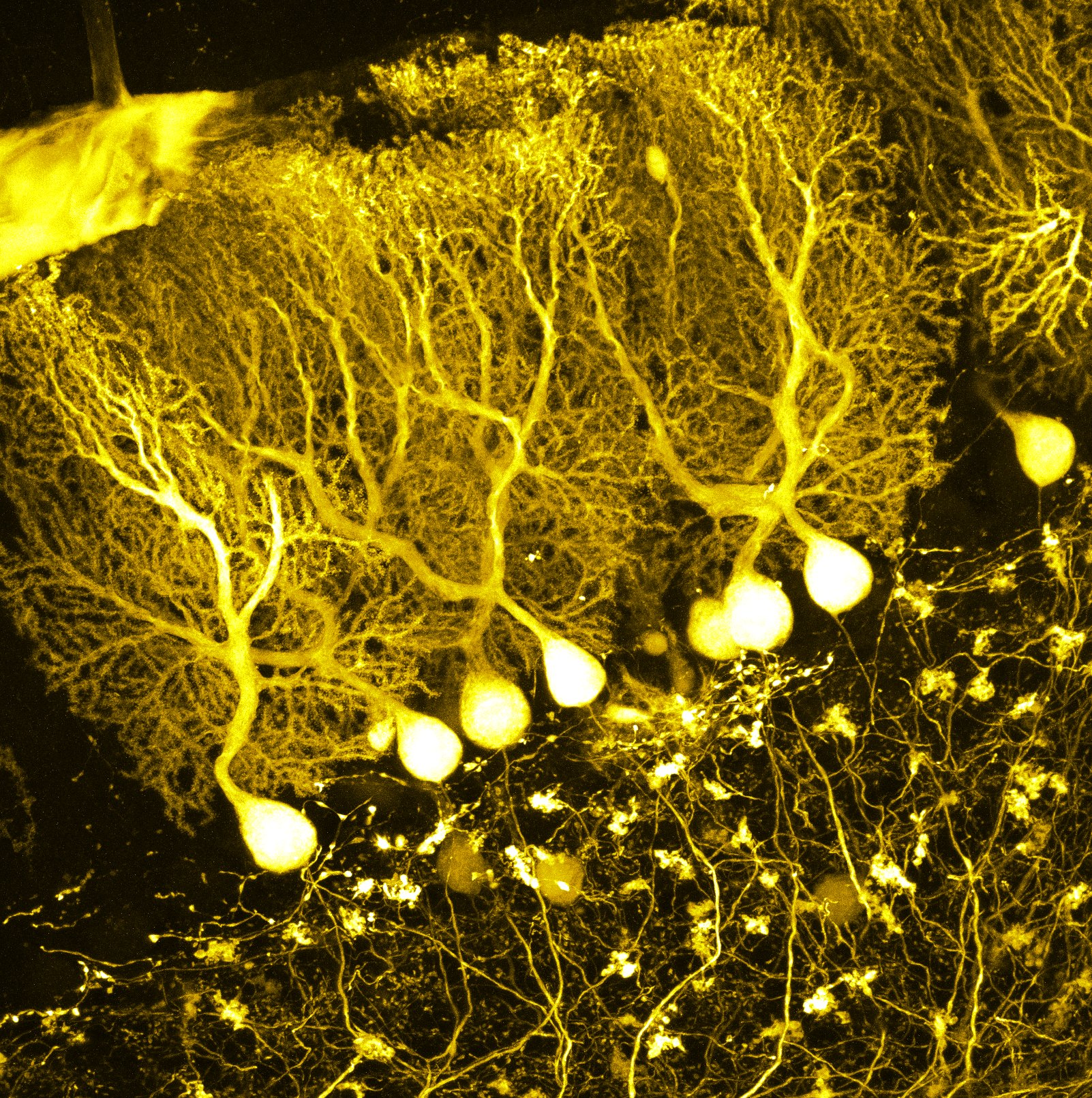
Purkinje cells in the cerebellum

Brain cell types are the functional neurons, and supporting glia.

=== Neurons ===
Neurons, also called nerve cells, are the functional electrically excitable cells of the brain. They can only function in collaboration with other neurons and interneurons in a neural circuit. There are an estimated 100 billion neurons in the human brain. Neurons are polarised cells that are specialised for the conduction of action potentials also called nerve impulses. They can also synthesise membrane and protein. Neurons communicate with other neurons using neurotransmitters released from their synapses, and they may be inhibitory, excitatory or neuromodulatory. Neurons may be termed by their associated neurotransmitter such as excitatory dopaminergic neurons and inhibitory GABAergic neurons.

Cortical interneurons only make up around a fifth of the neuronal population, yet they still play a major role in modulating cortical activity needed for cognition along with many aspects of learning and memory. Cortical interneurons vary in shape, molecular make-up, and electrophysiology; they function collectively to maintain the balance between excitation and inhibition in the cortex primarily through the use of GABA. Disruption of this balance is a common feature of neuropsychiatric disorders such as schizophrenia. A cause of the disruption can occur in prenatal development through the exposure to chemicals and environment.

In the cerebral cortex different neurons occupy the different cortical layers and include the pyramidal neurons and rosehip neurons. In the cerebellum Purkinje cells and interneuronal Golgi cells predominate.

=== Glia ===
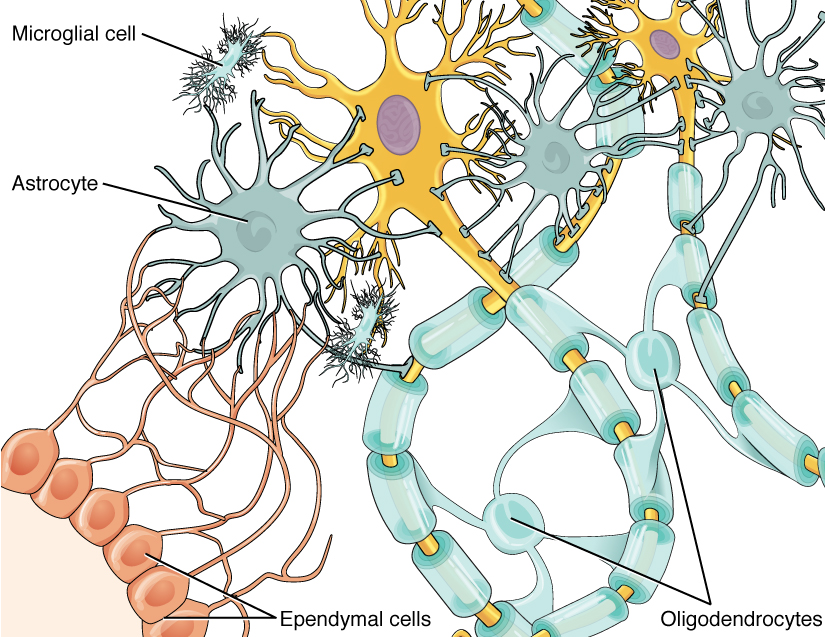
Types of glial cell

Glial cells are the supporting cells of the neurons. The three types of glial cells are astrocytes, oligodendrocytes, and ependymal cells, known collectively as macroglia, and the smaller scavenger cells known as microglia. Glial stem cells are found in all parts of the adult brain. Glial cells greatly outnumber neurons and apart from their supporting role to neurons, glia – astrocytes in particular have been acknowledged as being able to communicate with neurons involving a signalling process similar to neurotransmission called gliotransmission. They cannot produce an action potential as generated by a neuron but in their large numbers they can produce chemicals expressing excitability that exert an influence on neural circuitry. The star-like shape of the astrocyte allows contact with a great many synapses.

Microglia account for about around 5–10% of cells found within the brain.
