= Glutamate permease =

Glt_symporter

Identifiers
- Symbol: Glt_symporter
- Pfam: PF03616
- Pfam clan: CL0064
- InterPro: IPR004445
- TCDB: 2.A.27
Available protein structures:
- PDB: IPR004445 PF03616 (ECOD; PDBsum)
- AlphaFold: IPR004445; PF03616

The sodium/glutamate symporter, also known as glutamate permease, is a transmembrane protein family found in bacteria and archaea. These proteins are symporters that are responsible for the sodium-dependent uptake of extracellular glutamate into the cell. They are integral membrane proteins located in the bacterial inner membrane. The best-studied member of the family is GltS from Escherichia coli. GltS contains ten transmembrane helices arranged in two antiparallel 5-helix domains and functions as a homodimer. Substrates for GltS include L- and D-glutamate, as well as toxic analogs α-methylglutamate, and homocysteate. In studies of E. coli growth, bacteria without GltS were unable to grow in a medium where glutamate is the only source of carbon.

The family is evolutionarily distant from other glutamate transporters. Phylogenetic analyses of GltS genes suggest that their presence in cyanobacteria can be attributed to at least two horizontal gene transfer events.
