= Astrocyte =

Type of brain cell

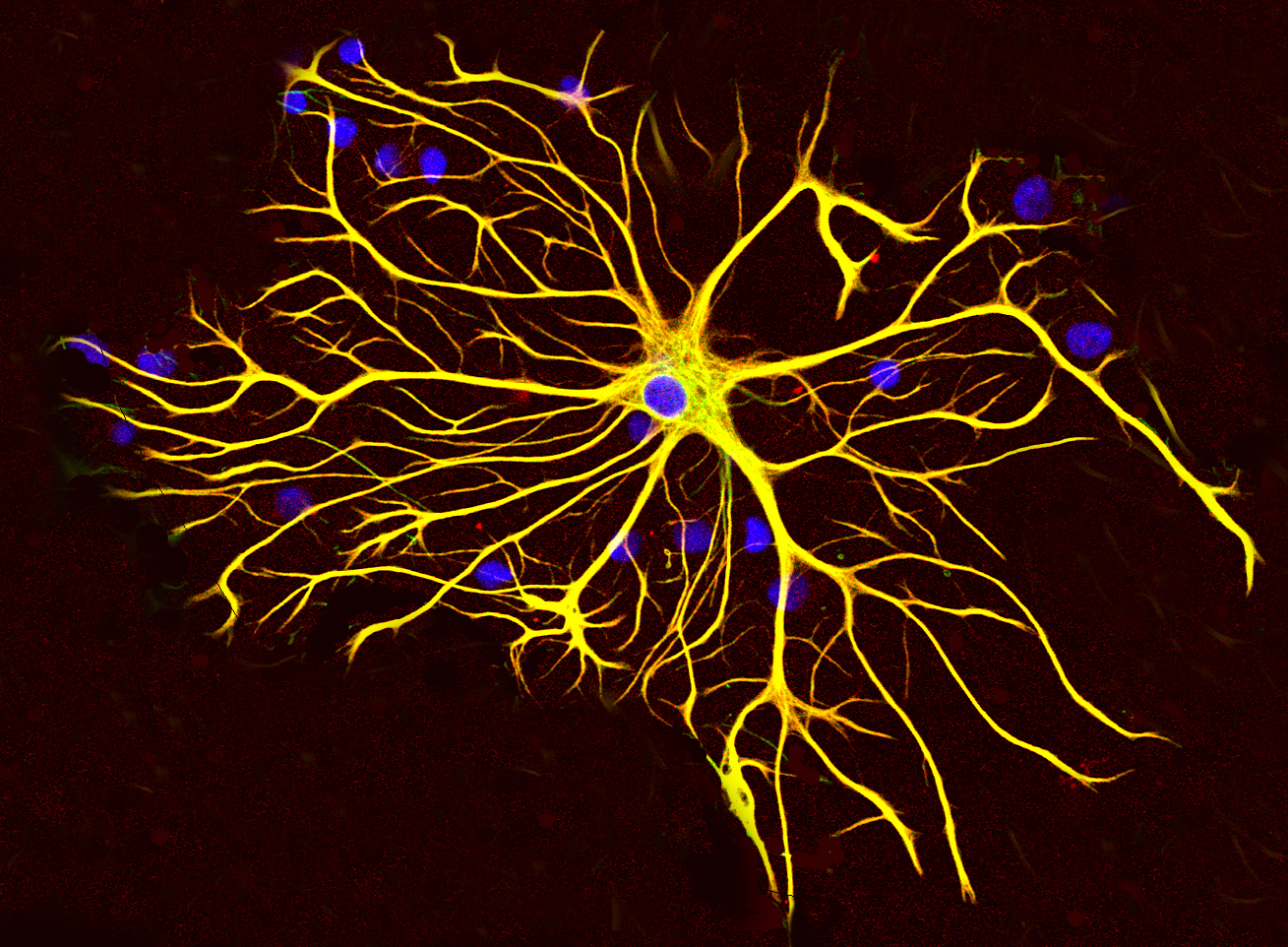
- An astrocyte from a rat brain grown in tissue culture and stained with antibodies to GFAP (red) and vimentin (green). Both proteins are present in large amounts in the intermediate filaments of this cell, so the cell appears yellow. The blue material shows DNA visualized with DAPI stain, and reveals the nucleus of the astrocyte and of other cells. Image courtesy of EnCor Biotechnology Inc.

Details
- Precursor: Glioblast
- Location: Brain and spinal cord

Identifiers
- Latin: astrocytus
- MeSH: D001253
- NeuroLex ID: sao1394521419
- TH: H2.00.06.2.00002, H2.00.06.2.01008
- FMA: 54537

Astrocytes (from Ancient Greek ἄστρον, ástron, "star" and κύτος, kútos, "cavity", "cell"), also known collectively as astroglia, are characteristic star-shaped glial cells in the brain and spinal cord. They perform many functions, including biochemical control of endothelial cells that form the blood–brain barrier, provision of nutrients to the nervous tissue, maintenance of extracellular ion balance, regulation of cerebral blood flow, and a role in the repair and scarring process of the brain and spinal cord following infection and traumatic injuries. The proportion of astrocytes in the brain is not well defined; depending on the counting technique used, studies have found that the astrocyte proportion varies by region and ranges from 20% to around 40% of all glia. Another study reports that astrocytes are the most numerous cell type in the brain. Astrocytes are the major source of cholesterol in the central nervous system. Apolipoprotein E transports cholesterol from astrocytes to neurons and other glial cells, regulating cell signaling in the brain. Astrocytes in humans are more than twenty times larger than in rodent brains, and make contact with more than ten times the number of synapses.

Research since the mid-1990s has shown that astrocytes propagate intercellular Ca^{2+} waves over long distances in response to stimulation, and, similar to neurons, release transmitters (called gliotransmitters) in a Ca^{2+}-dependent manner. Data suggest that astrocytes also signal to neurons through Ca^{2+}-dependent release of glutamate. Such discoveries have made astrocytes an important area of research within the field of neuroscience.

== Structure ==
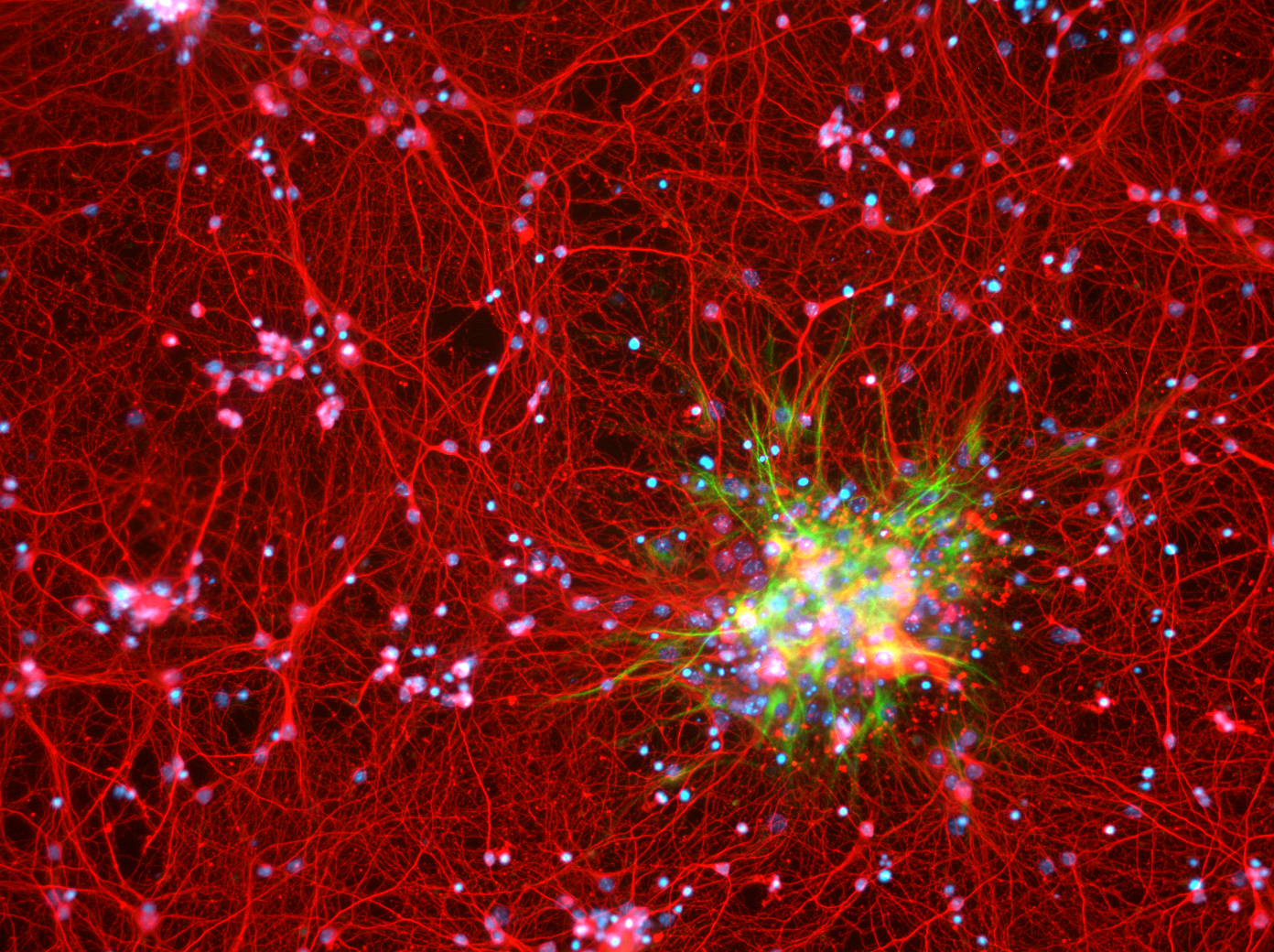
Astrocytes (green) in the context of neurons (red) in a mouse cortex cell culture

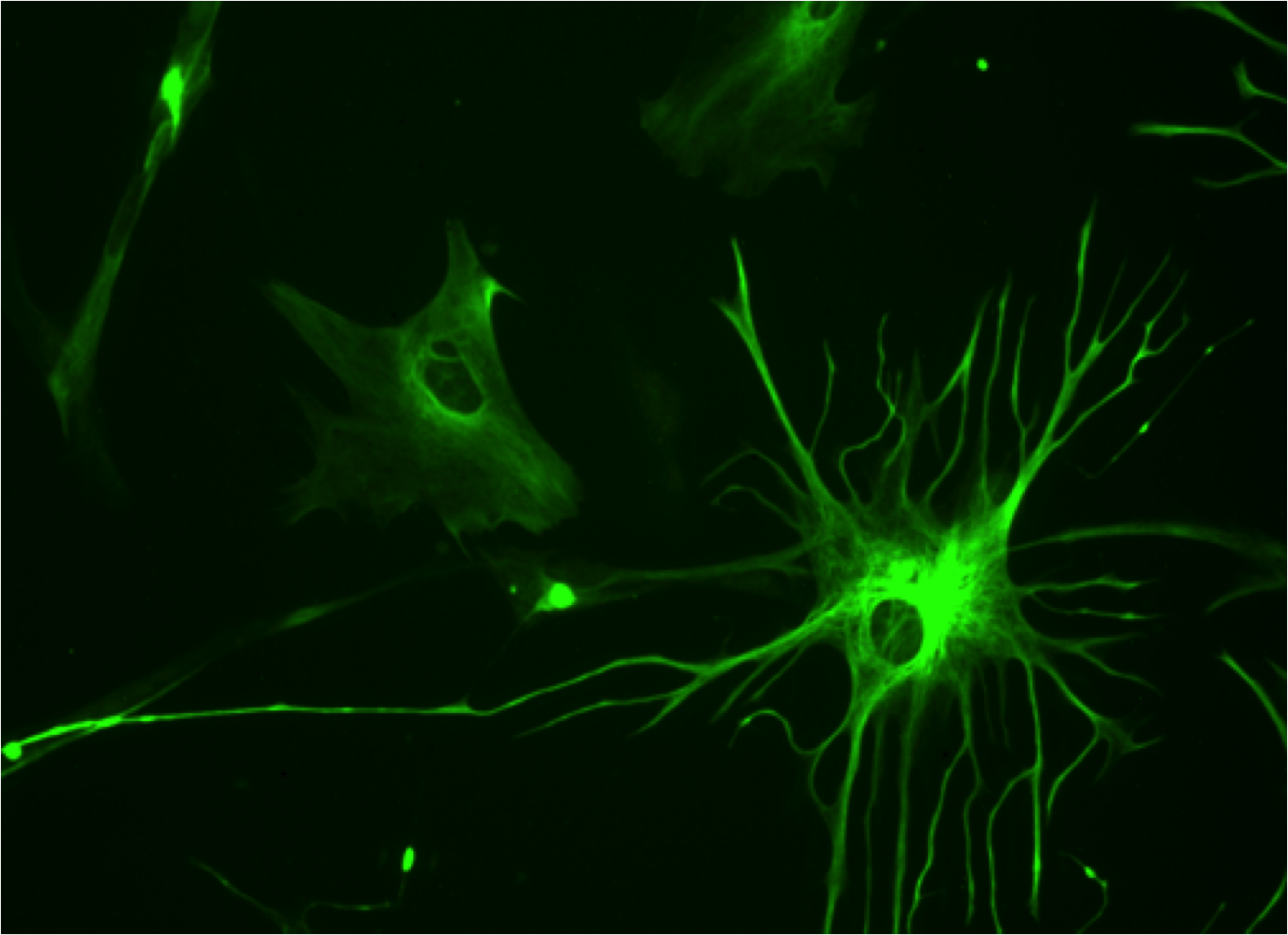
23-week-old fetal brain culture human astrocyte

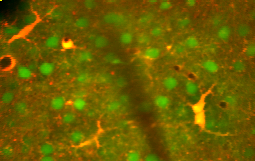
Astrocytes (red-yellow) among neurons (green) in the living cerebral cortex

Astrocytes are a sub-type of glial cells in the central nervous system. They are also known as astrocytic glial cells. Star-shaped, their many processes envelop synapses made by neurons. In humans, a single astrocyte can interact with up to two million synapses at a time. Astrocytes are classically identified histologically; many of these cells express glial fibrillary acidic protein (GFAP), a type III intermediate filament protein.

=== Types ===
Types of astrocytes in the central nervous system include fibrous (in white matter), protoplasmic (in grey matter), and radial glial cells.

==== Fibrous astrocytes ====
The fibrous astrocytes are usually located within white matter, have relatively few organelles, and exhibit long unbranched cellular processes. This type often has astrocyte endfeet processes that physically connect the cells to the outside of capillary walls when they are in proximity to them.

==== Protoplasmic astrocytes ====
The protoplasmic astrocytes are the most prevalent and are found in grey matter tissue, possess a larger quantity of organelles, and exhibit short and highly branched tertiary processes.

==== Radial glial cells ====
The radial glial cells are disposed in planes perpendicular to the axes of ventricles. One of their processes abuts the pia mater, while the other is deeply buried in grey matter. Radial glia are mostly present during development, playing a role in neuron migration. Müller cells of the retina and Bergmann glia cells of the cerebellar cortex represent an exception, being present still during adulthood. When in proximity to the pia mater, all three forms of astrocytes send out processes to form the pia-glial membrane.

=== Energy use ===
Early assessments of energy use in grey matter signaling suggested that 95% was attributed to neurons and 5% to astrocytes. However, after discovering that action potentials were more efficient than initially believed, the energy budget was adjusted: 70% for dendrites, 15% for axons, and 7% for astrocytes. Previous accounts assumed that astrocytes captured synaptic K^{+} solely via Kir4.1 channels. However, it's now understood they also utilize Na^{+}/K^{+} ATPase. Factoring in this active buffering, astrocytic energy demand increases by >200%. This is supported by 3D neuropil reconstructions indicating similar mitochondrial densities in both cell types, as well as cell-specific transcriptomic and proteomic data, and tricarboxylic acid cycle rates. Therefore "Gram-per-gram, astrocytes turn out to be as expensive as neurons".

== Development ==
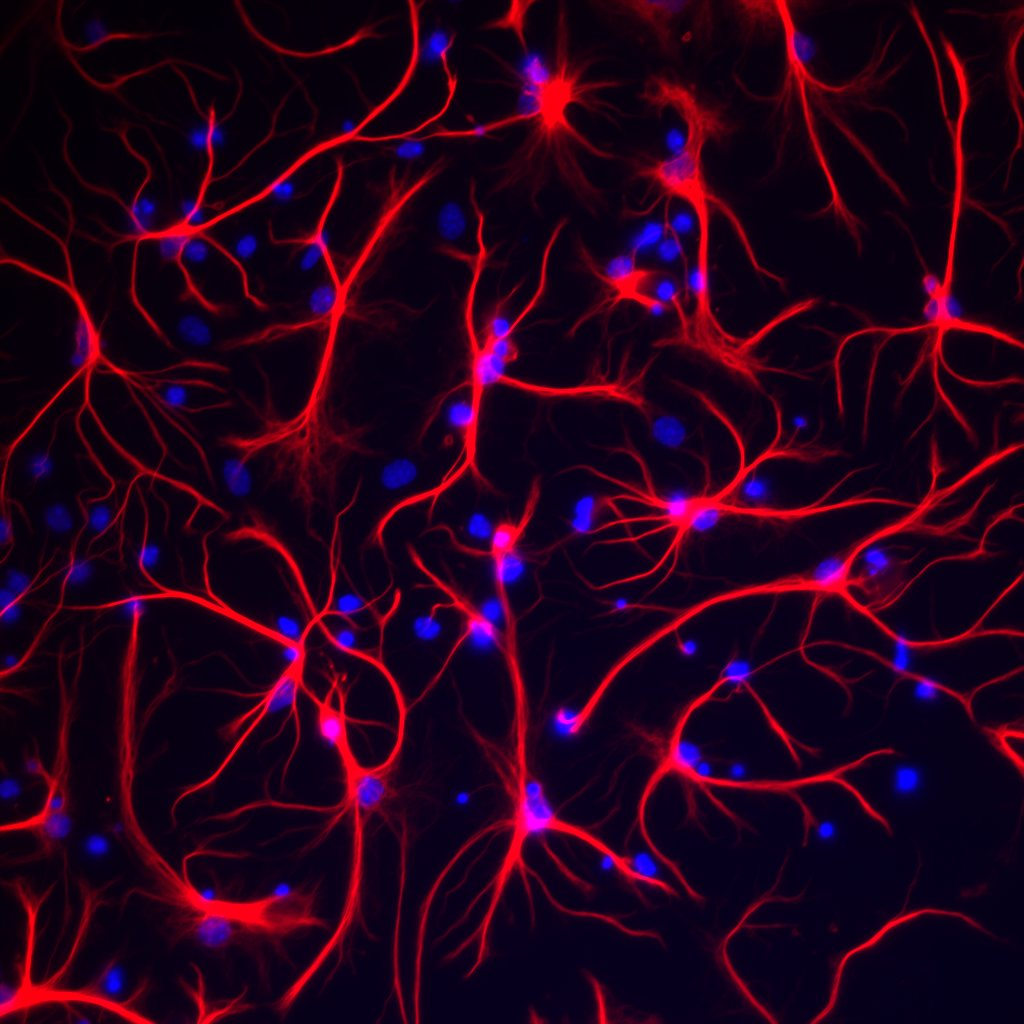
Astrocytes are depicted in red. Cell nuclei are depicted in blue. Astrocytes were obtained from brains of newborn mice.

Astrocytes are macroglial cells in the central nervous system. Astrocytes are derived from heterogeneous populations of progenitor cells in the neuroepithelium of the developing central nervous system. There is remarkable similarity between the well known genetic mechanisms that specify the lineage of diverse neuron subtypes and that of macroglial cells. Just as with neuronal cell specification, canonical signaling factors like sonic hedgehog (SHH), fibroblast growth factor (FGFs), WNTs and bone morphogenetic proteins (BMPs), provide positional information to developing macroglial cells through morphogen gradients along the dorsal–ventral, anterior–posterior and medial–lateral axes. The resultant patterning along the neuraxis leads to segmentation of the neuroepithelium into progenitor domains (p0, p1 p2, p3 and pMN) for distinct neuron types in the developing spinal cord. On the basis of several studies it is now believed that this model also applies to macroglial cell specification. Studies carried out by Hochstim and colleagues have demonstrated that three distinct populations of astrocytes arise from the p1, p2 and p3 domains. These subtypes of astrocytes can be identified on the basis of their expression of different transcription factors (PAX6, NKX6.1) and cell surface markers (reelin and SLIT1). The three populations of astrocyte subtypes which have been identified are:

- Dorsally located VA1 astrocytes, derived from p1 domain, express PAX6 and reelin.
- Ventrally located VA3 astrocytes, derived from p3, express NKX6.1 and SLIT1.
- Intermediate white-matter located VA2 astrocyte, derived from the p2 domain, which express PAX6, NKX6.1, reelin and SLIT1.

After astrocyte specification has occurred in the developing CNS, it is believed that astrocyte precursors migrate to their final positions within the nervous system before the process of terminal differentiation occurs.

== Function ==
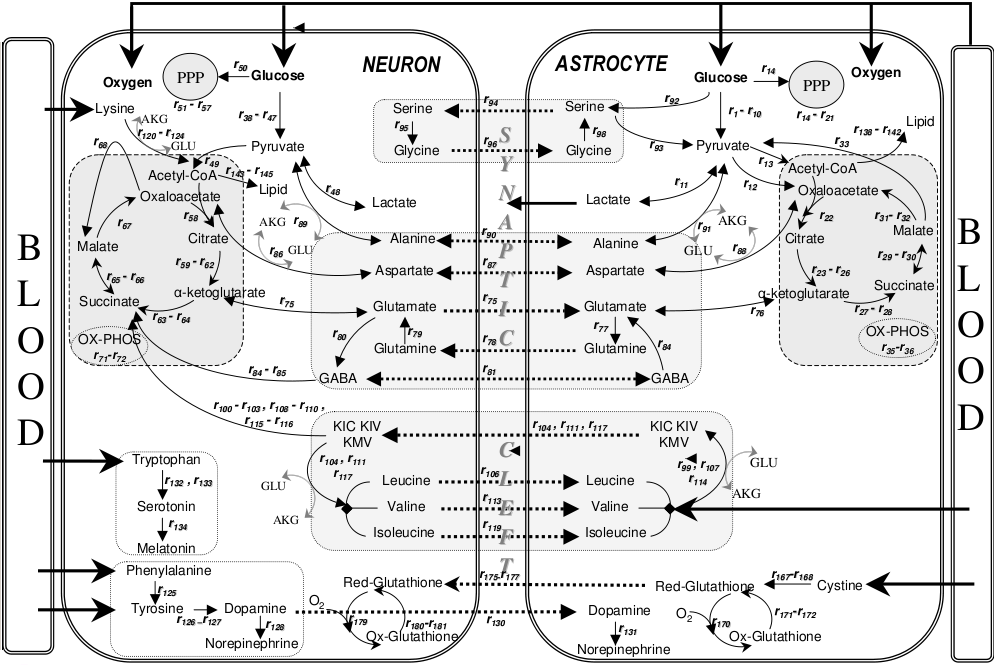
Metabolic interactions between astrocytes and neurons

Astrocytes help form the physical structure of the brain, and are thought to play a number of active roles, including the secretion or absorption of neural transmitters and maintenance of the blood–brain barrier. The concept of a tripartite synapse has been proposed, referring to the tight relationship occurring at synapses among a presynaptic element, a postsynaptic element, and a glial element.

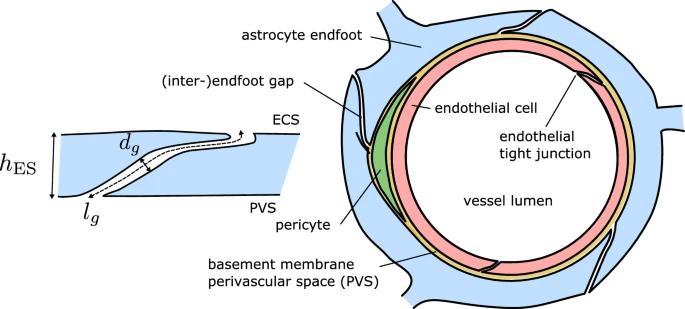
Astrocyte endfeet processes surrounding a blood vessel

- Structural: They are involved in the physical structuring of the brain. Astrocytes get their name because they are star-shaped. They are the most abundant glial cells in the brain that are closely associated with neuronal synapses. They regulate the transmission of electrical impulses within the brain.
- Glycogen fuel reserve buffer: Astrocytes contain glycogen and are capable of gluconeogenesis. The astrocytes next to neurons in the frontal cortex and hippocampus store and release glucose. Thus, astrocytes can fuel neurons with glucose during periods of high rate of glucose consumption and glucose shortage. A recent research on rats suggests there may be a connection between this activity and physical exercise.
- Metabolic support: They provide neurons with nutrients such as lactate.
- Glucose sensing: normally associated with neurons, the detection of interstitial glucose levels within the brain is also controlled by astrocytes. Astrocytes in vitro become activated by low glucose and are in vivo this activation increases gastric emptying to increase digestion.
- Blood–brain barrier: The astrocyte endfeet processes encircling endothelial cells were thought to aid in the maintenance of the blood–brain barrier, and recent research indicates that they do play a substantial role, along with the tight junctions and basal lamina. However, it has recently been shown that astrocyte activity is linked to blood flow in the brain, and that this is what is actually being measured in fMRI.
- Transmitter uptake and release: Astrocytes express plasma membrane transporters for several neurotransmitters, including glutamate, ATP, and GABA. More recently, astrocytes were shown to release glutamate or ATP in a vesicular, Ca^{2+}-dependent manner. (This has been disputed for hippocampal astrocytes.)
- Regulation of ion concentration in the extracellular space: Astrocytes express potassium channels at a high density. When neurons are active, they release potassium, increasing the local extracellular concentration. Because astrocytes are highly permeable to potassium, they rapidly clear the excess accumulation in the extracellular space. If this function is interfered with, the extracellular concentration of potassium will rise, leading to neuronal depolarization by the Goldman equation. Abnormal accumulation of extracellular potassium is well known to result in epileptic neuronal activity.
- Trace metal homeostasis: Astrocytes are the principal regulators of trace metal homeostasis in the central nervous system. They serve as the main storage and distribution sites for copper, manganese, zinc and iron, protecting neurons from metal-induced toxicity while supplying these essential cofactors. Astrocytes accumulate copper efficiently via the high-affinity transporter CTR1 and store it bound to glutathione and metallothioneins. They export copper via the copper-transporting ATPase ATP7A, thereby supplying copper to neighbouring neurons. Astrocytes are the main storage site for manganese in the brain, accumulating roughly 50 times more Mn²⁺ than neurons. They rapidly take up excess zinc through zinc transporters, shielding neurons from zinc toxicity. Astrocytes also participate in brain iron homeostasis by uptake via DMT1 and storage in ferritin. Dysregulation of astrocyte-mediated metal homeostasis is implicated in several neurodegenerative disorders, including Alzheimer's disease, Parkinson's disease, and Wilson's disease.
- Modulation of synaptic transmission: In the supraoptic nucleus of the hypothalamus, rapid changes in astrocyte morphology have been shown to affect heterosynaptic transmission between neurons. In the hippocampus, astrocytes suppress synaptic transmission by releasing ATP, which is hydrolyzed by ectonucleotidases to yield adenosine. Adenosine acts on neuronal adenosine receptors to inhibit synaptic transmission, thereby increasing the dynamic range available for LTP.
- Vasomodulation: Astrocytes may serve as intermediaries in neuronal regulation of blood flow.
- Promotion of the myelinating activity of oligodendrocytes: Electrical activity in neurons causes them to release ATP, which serves as an important stimulus for myelin to form. However, the ATP does not act directly on oligodendrocytes. Instead, it causes astrocytes to secrete cytokine leukemia inhibitory factor (LIF), a regulatory protein that promotes the myelinating activity of oligodendrocytes. This suggests that astrocytes have an executive-coordinating role in the brain.
- Nervous system repair: Upon injury to nerve cells within the central nervous system, astrocytes fill up the space to form a glial scar, and may contribute to neural repair. The role of astrocytes in CNS regeneration following injury is not well understood though. The glial scar has traditionally been described as an impermeable barrier to regeneration, thus implicating a negative role in axon regeneration. However, recently, it was found through genetic ablation studies that astrocytes are actually required for regeneration to occur. More importantly, the authors found that the astrocyte scar is actually essential for stimulated axons (that axons that have been coaxed to grow via neurotrophic supplementation) to extend through the injured spinal cord. Astrocytes that have been pushed into a reactive phenotype (termed astrogliosis, defined by the upregulation of among others, GFAP and vimentin expression, a definition still under debate) may actually be toxic to neurons, releasing signals that can kill neurons. Much work, however, remains to elucidate their role in nervous system injury.
- Long-term potentiation: There is debate among scientists as to whether astrocytes integrate learning and memory in the hippocampus. Recently, it has been shown that engrafting human glial progenitor cell in nascent mice brains causes the cells to differentiate into astrocytes. After differentiation, these cells increase LTP and improve memory performance in the mice.
- Circadian clock: Astrocytes alone are sufficient to drive the molecular oscillations in the SCN and circadian behavior in mice, and thus can autonomously initiate and sustain complex mammalian behavior.
- The switch of the nervous system: Based on the evidence listed below, it has been recently conjectured in, that macro glia (and astrocytes in particular) act both as a lossy neurotransmitter capacitor and as the logical switch of the nervous system. I.e., macroglia either block or enable the propagation of the stimulus along the nervous system, depending on their membrane state and the level of the stimulus.

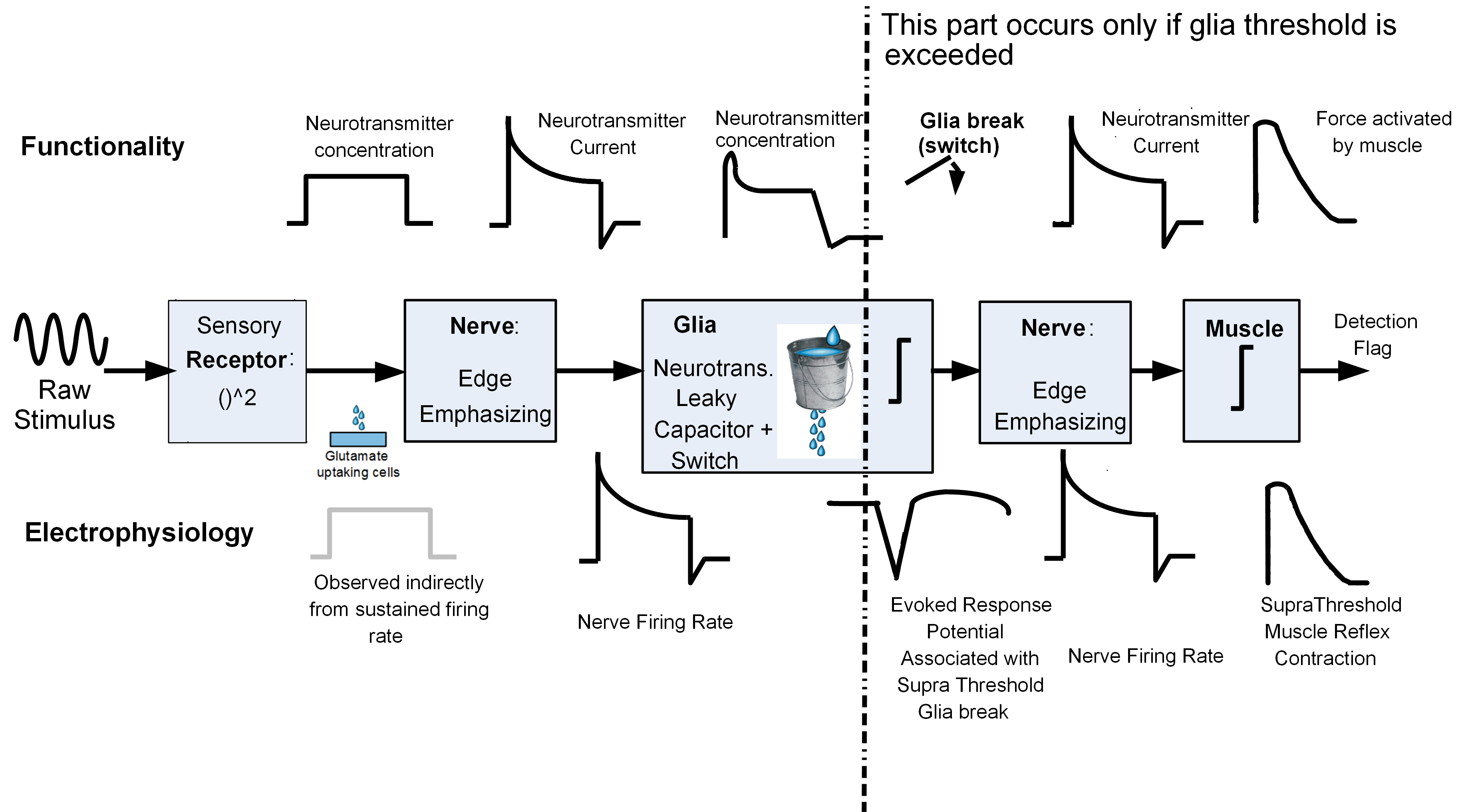
Fig. 6 The conjectured switching role of glia in the biological neural detection scheme as suggested by Nossenson et al.

Evidence supporting the switch and lossy capacitor role of glia as suggested in
Evidence type	Description	References
Calcium evidence	Calcium waves appear only if a certain concentration of neurotransmitter is exceeded	
Electrophysiological evidence	A negative wave appears when the stimulus level crosses a certain threshold. The shape of the electrophysiological response is different and has the opposite polarity compared to the characteristic neural response, suggesting that cells other than neurons might be involved.	
Psychophysical evidence	The negative electrophysiological response is accompanied with all-or-none actions. A moderate negative electrophysiological response appears in conscious logical decisions such as perception tasks. An intense sharp negative wave appear in epileptic seizures and during reflexes.	
Radioactivity based glutamate uptake tests	Glutamate uptake tests indicate that astrocyte process glutamate in a rate which is initially proportional to glutamate concentration. This supports the leaky capacitor model, where the 'leak' is glutamate processing by glia's glutamine synthetase. Furthermore, the same tests indicate on a saturation level after which neurotransmitter uptake level stops rising proportionally to neurotransmitter concentration. The latter supports the existence of a threshold. The graphs which show these characteristics are referred to as Michaelis-Menten graphs	

Astrocytes are linked by gap junctions, creating an electrically coupled (functional) syncytium. Because of this ability of astrocytes to communicate with their neighbors, changes in the activity of one astrocyte can have repercussions on the activities of others that are quite distant from the original astrocyte.

An influx of Ca^{2+} ions into astrocytes is the essential change that ultimately generates calcium waves. Because this influx is directly caused by an increase in blood flow to the brain, calcium waves are said to be a kind of hemodynamic response function. An increase in intracellular calcium concentration can propagate outwards through this functional syncytium. Mechanisms of calcium wave propagation include diffusion of calcium ions and IP3 through gap junctions and extracellular ATP signalling. Calcium elevations are the primary known axis of activation in astrocytes, and are necessary and sufficient for some types of astrocytic glutamate release. Given the importance of calcium signaling in astrocytes, tight regulatory mechanisms for the progression of the spatio-temporal calcium signaling have been developed. Via mathematical analysis it has been shown that localized inflow of Ca^{2+} ions yields a localized raise in the cytosolic concentration of Ca^{2+} ions. Moreover, cytosolic Ca^{2+} accumulation is independent of every intracellular calcium flux and depends on the Ca^{2+} exchange across the membrane, cytosolic calcium diffusion, geometry of the cell, extracellular calcium perturbation, and initial concentrations.

=== Tripartite synapse ===
Within the dorsal horn of the spinal cord, activated astrocytes have the ability to respond to almost all neurotransmitters and, upon activation, release a multitude of neuroactive molecules such as glutamate, ATP, nitric oxide (NO), and prostaglandins (PG), which in turn influences neuronal excitability. The close association between astrocytes and presynaptic and postsynaptic terminals as well as their ability to integrate synaptic activity and release neuromodulators has been termed the tripartite synapse. Synaptic modulation by astrocytes takes place because of this three-part association.

A 2023 study suggested astrocytes, previously underexplored brain cells, could be key to extending wakefulness without negative effects on cognition and health.

=== Glutamatergic gliotransmission ===
Some specialized astrocytes mediate glutamatergic gliotransmission in the central nervous system. Such cells have been called hybrid brain cells because they exhibit both neuron-like and glial-like properties. Unlike traditional neurons, these cells not only transmit electrical signals but also provide supportive roles typically associated with glial cells, such as regulating the brain's extracellular environment and maintaining overall homeostasis.

== Clinical significance ==
=== Astrocytomas ===
Astrocytomas are primary tumors in the CNS that develop from astrocytes. It is also possible that glial progenitors or neural stem cells can give rise to astrocytomas. These tumors may occur in many parts of the brain or spinal cord. Astrocytomas are divided into two categories: low grade (I and II) and high grade (III and IV). Low grade tumors are more common in children, and high grade tumors are more common in adults. Malignant astrocytomas are more prevalent among men, contributing to worse survival.

Pilocytic astrocytomas are grade I tumors. They are considered benign and slow growing tumors. Pilocytic astrocytomas frequently have cystic portions filled with fluid and a nodule, which is the solid portion. Most are located in the cerebellum. Therefore, most symptoms are related to balance or coordination difficulties. They also occur more frequently in children and teens.

Fibrillary astrocytomas are grade II tumors. They grow relatively slowly so are usually considered benign, but they infiltrate the surrounding healthy tissue and can become malignant. Fibrillary astrocytomas commonly occur in younger people, who often present with seizures.

Anaplastic astrocytomas are grade III malignant tumors. They grow more rapidly than lower grade tumors. Anaplastic astrocytomas recur more frequently than lower grade tumors because their tendency to spread into surrounding tissue makes them difficult to completely remove surgically.

Glioblastoma is a grade IV cancer that may originate from astrocytes or an existing astrocytoma. Approximately 50% of all brain tumors are glioblastomas. Glioblastomas can contain multiple glial cell types, including astrocytes and oligodendrocytes. Glioblastomas are generally considered to be the most invasive type of glial tumor, as they grow rapidly and spread to nearby tissue. Treatment may be complicated, because one tumor cell type may die off in response to a particular treatment while the other cell types may continue to multiply.

=== Neurodevelopmental disorders ===
Astrocytes have emerged as important participants in various neurodevelopmental disorders. This view states that astrocyte dysfunction may result in improper neural circuitry, which underlies certain psychiatric disorders such as autism spectrum disorders and schizophrenia.

=== Chronic pain ===
Under normal conditions, pain conduction begins with some noxious signal followed by an action potential carried by nociceptive (pain sensing) afferent neurons, which elicit excitatory postsynaptic potentials (EPSP) in the dorsal horn of the spinal cord. That message is then relayed to the cerebral cortex, where we translate those EPSPs into "pain". Since the discovery of astrocyte-neuron signaling, our understanding of the conduction of pain has been dramatically complicated. Pain processing is no longer seen as a repetitive relay of signals from body to brain, but as a complex system that can be up- and down-regulated by a number of different factors. One factor at the forefront of recent research is in the pain-potentiating synapse located in the dorsal horn of the spinal cord and the role of astrocytes in encapsulating these synapses. Garrison and co-workers were the first to suggest association when they found a correlation between astrocyte hypertrophy in the dorsal horn of the spinal cord and hypersensitivity to pain after peripheral nerve injury, typically considered an indicator of glial activation after injury. Astrocytes detect neuronal activity and can release chemical transmitters, which in turn control synaptic activity. In the past, hyperalgesia was thought to be modulated by the release of substance P and excitatory amino acids (EAA), such as glutamate, from the presynaptic afferent nerve terminals in the spinal cord dorsal horn. Subsequent activation of AMPA (α-amino-3-hydroxy-5-methyl-4-isoxazole propionic acid), NMDA (N-methyl-D-aspartate) and kainate subtypes of ionotropic glutamate receptors follows. It is the activation of these receptors that potentiates the pain signal up the spinal cord. This idea, although true, is an oversimplification of pain transduction. A litany of other neurotransmitter and neuromodulators, such as calcitonin gene-related peptide (CGRP), adenosine triphosphate (ATP), brain-derived neurotrophic factor (BDNF), somatostatin, vasoactive intestinal peptide (VIP), galanin, and vasopressin are all synthesized and released in response to noxious stimuli. In addition to each of these regulatory factors, several other interactions between pain-transmitting neurons and other neurons in the dorsal horn have added impact on pain pathways.

==== Two states of persistent pain ====
After persistent peripheral tissue damage, there is a release of several factors from the injured tissue as well as in the spinal dorsal horn. These factors increase the responsiveness of the dorsal horn pain-projection neurons to ensuing stimuli, termed "spinal sensitization", thus amplifying the pain impulse to the brain. Release of glutamate, substance P, and calcitonin gene-related peptide (CGRP) mediates NMDAR activation (originally silent because it is plugged by Mg2+), thus aiding in depolarization of the postsynaptic pain-transmitting neurons (PTN). In addition, activation of IP3 signaling and MAPKs (mitogen-activated protein kinases) such as ERK and JNK, bring about an increase in the synthesis of inflammatory factors that alter glutamate transporter function. ERK also further activates AMPARs and NMDARs in neurons. Nociception is further sensitized by the association of ATP and substance P with their respective receptors (P_{2}X_{3}) and neurokinin 1 receptor (NK1R), as well as activation of metabotropic glutamate receptors and release of BDNF. Persistent presence of glutamate in the synapse eventually results in dysregulation of GLT1 and GLAST, crucial transporters of glutamate into astrocytes. Ongoing excitation can also induce ERK and JNK activation, resulting in release of several inflammatory factors.

As noxious pain is sustained, spinal sensitization creates transcriptional changes in the neurons of the dorsal horn that lead to altered function for extended periods. Mobilization of Ca^{2+} from internal stores results from persistent synaptic activity and leads to the release of glutamate, ATP, tumor necrosis factor-α (TNF-α), interleukin 1β (IL-1β), IL-6, nitric oxide (NO), and prostaglandin E2 (PGE2). Activated astrocytes are also a source of matrix metalloproteinase 2 (MMP2), which induces pro-IL-1β cleavage and sustains astrocyte activation. In this chronic signaling pathway, p38 is activated as a result of IL-1β signaling, and there is a presence of chemokines that trigger their receptors to become active. In response to nerve damage, heat shock proteins (HSP) are released and can bind to their respective TLRs, leading to further activation.

=== Other pathologies ===
Other clinically significant pathologies involving astrocytes include astrogliosis and astrocytopathy. Examples of these include multiple sclerosis, anti-AQP4+ neuromyelitis optica, Rasmussen's encephalitis, Alexander disease, and amyotrophic lateral sclerosis. Studies have shown that astrocytes may be implied in neurodegenerative diseases, such as Alzheimer's disease, Parkinson's disease, Huntington's disease, Stuttering and amyotrophic lateral sclerosis, and in acute brain injuries, such as intracerebral hemorrhage and traumatic brain injury.

==== Gomori-positive astrocytes and brain dysfunction ====
A type of astrocyte with an aging-related pathology has been described over the last fifty years. Astrocytes of this subtype possess prominent cytoplasmic granules that are intensely stained by Gomori's chrome alum hematoxylin stain, and hence are termed Gomori-positive (GP) astrocytes. They can be found throughout the brain, but are by far the most abundant in the olfactory bulbs, medial habenula, dentate gyrus of the hippocampus, arcuate nucleus of the hypothalamus, and in the dorsal medulla, just beneath the area postrema.

Gomori-positive cytoplasmic granules are derived from damaged mitochondria engulfed within lysosomes. Cytoplasmic granules contain undigested remnants of mitochondrial structures. These contents include heme-linked copper and iron atoms remaining from mitochondrial enzymes. These chemical substances account for the pseudoperoxidase activity of Gomori-positive granules that can utilized to stain for these granules. Oxidative stress is believed to be cause of damage to these astrocytes. However, the exact nature of this stress is uncertain.

Brain regions enriched in Gomori-positive astrocytes also contain a sub-population of specialized astrocytes that synthesize Fatty Acid Binding Protein 7 (FABP7). Indeed, astrocytes in the hypothalamus that synthesize FABP7 have also been shown to possess Gomori-positive granules. Thus, a connection between these two glial features is apparent. Recent data have shown that astrocytes, but not neurons, possess the mitochondrial enzymes needed to metabolize fatty acids, and that the resulting oxidative stress can damage mitochondria. Thus, an increased uptake and oxidation of fatty acids in glia containing FABP7 is likely to cause the oxidative stress and damage to mitochondria in these cells. Also, FABP proteins have recently been shown to interact with a protein called synuclein to cause mitochondrial damage.

==== Possible roles in pathophysiology ====
Astrocytes can transfer mitochondria into adjacent neurons to improve neuronal function. It is therefore plausible that the damage to astrocyte mitochondria seen in GP astrocytes could affect the activity of neurons.

A number of hypothalamic functions show declines in aging that may be related to GP astrocytes. For example, GP astrocytes are in close contact with neurons that make a neurotransmitter called dopamine in both the rat and human hypothalamus. The dopamine produced by these neurons is carried to the nearby pituitary gland to inhibit the release of a hormone called prolactin from the pituitary. The activity of dopaminergic neurons declines during aging, leading to elevations in blood levels of prolactin that can provoke breast cancer. An aging-associated change in astrocyte function might contribute to this change in dopaminergic activity.

FABP7+ astrocytes are in close contact with neurons in the arcuate nucleus of the hypothalamus that are responsive to a hormone called leptin that is produced by fat cells. Leptin-sensitive neurons regulate appetite and body weight. FABP7+ astrocytes regulate the responsiveness of these neurons to leptin. Mitochondrial damage in these astrocytes could thus alter the function of leptin-sensitive neurons and could contribute to an aging-associated dysregulation of feeding and body weight.

GP astrocytes may also be involved in the hypothalamic regulation of overall glucose metabolism. Recent data show that astrocytes function as glucose sensors and exert a commanding influence upon neuronal reactivity to changes in extracellular glucose. GP astrocytes possess high-capacity GLUT2-type glucose transporter proteins and appear to modulate the neuronal responses to glucose. Hypothalamic cells monitor blood levels of glucose and exert an influence upon blood glucose levels via an altered input to autonomic circuits that innervate liver and muscle cells.

The importance of astrocytes in aging-related disturbances in glucose metabolism has been recently illustrated by studies of diabetic animals. A single infusion of a protein called fibroblast growth factor-1 into the hypothalamus has been shown to permanently normalize blood glucose levels in diabetic rodents. This remarkable cure of diabetes mellitus is mediated by astrocytes. The most prominent genes activated by FGF-1 treatment include the genes responsible for the synthesis of FABP6 and FABP7 by astrocytes. These data confirm the importance of FABP7+ astrocytes for the control of blood glucose. Dysfunction of FABP7+/Gomori-positive astrocytes may contribute to the aging-related development of diabetes mellitus.

GP astrocytes are also present in the dentate gyrus of the hippocampus in both rodent and human brains. The hippocampus undergoes severe degenerative changes during aging in Alzheimer's disease. The reasons for these degenerative changes are currently being hotly debated. A recent study has shown that levels of glial proteins, and NOT neuronal proteins, are most abnormal in Alzheimer's disease. The glial protein most severely affected is FABP5. Another study showed that 100% of hippocampal astrocytes that contain FABP7 also contain FABP5. These data suggest that FABP7+/Gomori-positive astrocytes may play a role in Alzheimer's disease. An altered glial function in this region could compromise the function of dentate gyrus neurons and also the function of axons that terminate in the dentate gyrus. Many such axons originate in the lateral entorhinal cortex, which is the first brain region to show degeneration in Alzheimer's disease. Astrocyte pathology in the hippocampus thus might make a contribution to the pathology of Alzheimer's disease.

== Research ==
A study performed in November 2010 and published March 2011, was done by a team of scientists from the University of Rochester and University of Colorado School of Medicine. They did an experiment to attempt to repair trauma to the Central Nervous System of an adult rat by replacing the glial cells. When the glial cells were injected into the injury of the adult rat's spinal cord, astrocytes were generated by exposing human glial precursor cells to bone morphogenetic protein (bone morphogenetic protein is important because it is considered to create tissue architecture throughout the body). So, with the bone protein and human glial cells combined, they promoted significant recovery of conscious foot placement, axonal growth, and obvious increases in neuronal survival in the spinal cord laminae. On the other hand, human glial precursor cells and astrocytes generated from these cells by being in contact with ciliary neurotrophic factors, failed to promote neuronal survival and support of axonal growth at the spot of the injury.

One study done in Shanghai had two types of hippocampal neuronal cultures: In one culture, the neuron was grown from a layer of astrocytes and the other culture was not in contact with any astrocytes, but they were instead fed a glial conditioned medium (GCM), which inhibits the rapid growth of cultured astrocytes in the brains of rats in most cases. In their results they were able to see that astrocytes had a direct role in Long-term potentiation with the mixed culture (which is the culture that was grown from a layer of astrocytes) but not in GCM cultures.

Studies have shown that astrocytes play an important function in the regulation of neural stem cells. Research from the Schepens Eye Research Institute at Harvard shows the human brain to abound in neural stem cells, which are kept in a dormant state by chemical signals (ephrin-A2 and ephrin-A3) from the astrocytes. The astrocytes are able to activate the stem cells to transform into working neurons by dampening the release of ephrin-A2 and ephrin-A3.

In a study published in a 2011 issue of Nature Biotechnology a group of researchers from the University of Wisconsin reports that it has been able to direct embryonic and induced human stem cells to become astrocytes.

A 2012 study of the effects of marijuana on short-term memories found that THC activates CB1 receptors of astrocytes which cause receptors for AMPA to be removed from the membranes of associated neurons.

A 2023 study showed that astrocytes also play an active role in Alzheimer's disease. More specifically, when astrocytes became reactive they unleash the pathological effects of amyloid-beta on downstream tau phosphorylation and deposition, which very likely will lead to cognitive deterioration.

As astrocytes are increasingly recognized as active contributors to several neurological disorders and potential therapeutic targets, researchers are investigating how these cells can be monitored or modulated using emerging neurotechnologies. For example, a recent in vitro study (2025) reported that physiologically relevant concentrations of Ti_{3}C_{2}T_{x} MXene flakes, a promising two-dimensional nanomaterial for glial-targeted neural interfaces, were biocompatible with astrocytes and did not alter cell viability, morphology, or spontaneous calcium signaling. Research in this area aims to investigate how astrocytes interact with emerging neurotechnologies and engineered materials, which is increasingly important as tools for understanding and modulating brain function continue to advance.

== Classification ==
There are several different ways to classify astrocytes:

=== Lineage and antigenic phenotype ===
These have been established by classic work by Raff et al. in early 1980s on Rat optic nerves.

- Type 1: Antigenically Ran2^{+}, GFAP^{+}, FGFR3^{+}, A2B5^{−}, thus resembling the "type 1 astrocyte" of the postnatal day 7 rat optic nerve. These can arise from the tripotential glial restricted precursor cells (GRP), but not from the bipotential O2A/OPC (oligodendrocyte, type 2 astrocyte precursor, also called Oligodendrocyte progenitor cell) cells.
- Type 2: Antigenically A2B5^{+}, GFAP^{+}, FGFR3^{−}, Ran 2^{−}. These cells can develop in vitro from the either tripotential GRP (probably via O2A stage), from bipotential O2A cells, or in vivo when these progenitor cells are transplanted into lesion sites (but probably not in normal development, at least not in the rat optic nerve). Type 2 astrocytes are the major astrocytic component in postnatal optic nerve cultures that are generated by O2A cells grown in the presence of fetal calf serum but are not thought to exist in vivo. Some researchers think bipotential O2A cells in turn have been derived from the GRP.

=== Anatomical classification ===
- Protoplasmic: found in grey matter and have many branching processes whose end-feet envelop synapses. Some protoplasmic astrocytes are generated by multipotent subventricular zone progenitor cells.
- Gömöri-positive astrocytes: These are a subset of protoplasmic astrocytes that contain numerous cytoplasmic inclusions, or granules, that stain positively with Gömöri trichrome stain a chrome-alum hematoxylin stain. It is now known that these granules are formed from the remnants of degenerating mitochondria engulfed within lysosomes, Some type of oxidative stress appears to be responsible for the mitochondrial damage within these specialized astrocytes. Gömöri-positive astrocytes are much more abundant within the arcuate nucleus of the hypothalamus and in the hippocampus than in other brain regions. They may have a role in regulating the response of the hypothalamus to glucose.
- Fibrous: found in white matter and have long thin unbranched processes whose end-feet envelop nodes of Ranvier. Some fibrous astrocytes are generated by radial glia.

=== Transporter/receptor classification ===
- GluT type: these express glutamate transporters (EAAT1/SLC1A3 and EAAT2/SLC1A2) and respond to synaptic release of glutamate by transporter currents. The function and availability of EAAT2 is modulated by TAAR1, an intracellular receptor in human astrocytes.
- GluR type: these express glutamate receptors (mostly mGluR and AMPA type) and respond to synaptic release of glutamate by channel-mediated currents and IP3-dependent Ca^{2+} transients.

== See also ==
- Bergmann gliosis
- Gemistocyte
- Pituicyte
- List of human cell types derived from the germ layers
- List of distinct cell types in the adult human body
