= Potassium spatial buffering =

Potassium spatial buffering is a mechanism for the regulation of extracellular potassium concentration by astrocytes. Other mechanisms for astrocytic potassium clearance are carrier-operated, or channel-operated potassium-chloride uptake. The repolarization of neurons tends to increase potassium concentration in the extracellular matrix. If a significant rise occurs, it will reduce the concentration gradient across the neuronal membrane, resulting in depolarization. This resulting depolarization will lead to increased excitability or spontaneous firing. Astrocytes have large numbers of potassium ion channels facilitating the removal of potassium ions from the extracellular matrix. They are taken up at one region of the astrocyte and then distributed throughout the cytoplasm of the cell, and to other cells via astrocytic gap junctions. This keeps the level of extracellular potassium contents around a constant value to prevent interference with the normal propagation of an action potential throughout neural transmission.

== Potassium Spatial Buffering ==
Glial cells, once believed to have a passive role in CNS, are active regulators of numerous functions in the brain, including clearance of the neurotransmitter from the synapses, guidance during neuronal migration, control of neuronal synaptic transmission, and maintaining an ideal ionic environment for active communications between neurons in central nervous system.

Neurons are surrounded by extracellular fluid rich in sodium ions and poor in potassium ions. The concentrations of these ions are reversed inside the cells. Due to the difference in concentration, there is a chemical gradient across the cell membrane, which leads to sodium influx and potassium efflux. When the action potential takes place, a considerable change in extracellular potassium concentration occurs due to the limited volume of the CNS extracellular space. The change in potassium concentration in the extracellular space impacts a variety of neuronal processes, such as maintenance of membrane potential, activation and inactivation of voltage gated channels, synaptic transmission, and electrogenic transport of neurotransmitters. Change of extracellular potassium concentration of from 3mM can affect neural activity. Therefore, there are diverse cellular mechanisms for tight control of potassium ions, the most widely accepted mechanism being K+ spatial buffering mechanism. Orkand and his colleagues who first theorized spatial buffering stated "if a Glial cell becomes depolarized by K+ that has accumulated in the clefts, the resulting current carries K+ inward in the high [K+] region and out again, through electrically coupled Glial cells in low [K+] regions" In the model presented by Orkand and his colleagues, glial cells intake and traverse potassium ions from region of high concentrations to region of low concentration maintaining potassium concentration to be low in extracellular space. Glial cells are well suited for transportation of potassium ions since it has unusually high permeability to potassium ions and traverse long distance by its elongated shape or by being coupled to one another.

=== Potassium Regulatory Mechanisms ===
Potassium regulation can be broadly categorized into two categories: Potassium uptake and Potassium spatial buffering.

Potassium uptake involves the net clearance of excess extracellular potassium ions into astrocytes via the use of transporters like sodium-potassium ATPase or via potassium ion channels. The sodium-potassium pump in astrocytes is required to maintain low extracellular potassium ion levels around neurons. With this, the influx of potassium ions into glial cells is accompanied by the influx of chlorine or the efflux of sodium. Potassium uptake is a distinct mechanism when compared to potassium spatial buffering, in potassium uptake does not involve the redistribution of potassium ions from high to low concentrations via astrocytes. This process particularlay involves removing, or uptaking, high extracellular levels of potassium ions.

Potassium spatial buffering depends on functionally coupled astrocytes/glial cells that have high potassium permeability to transfer potassium ions from regions of elevated potassium concentration to regions of lower potassium concentration. This process is often done via glial cell fluxes, which are primarily mediated by inwardly-rectifying potassium ion channels. Potassium current is driven by the difference in glial membrane potential and local potassium equilibrium potential. When one region of potassium concentration increases, there is a net driving force causing potassium to flow into the glial cells. The entry of potassium causes a local depolarization that propagates electrotonically, or via the passive spread of electrical current through the glial cell network. This causes a net efflux of potassium ions out of glial cells, resulting in dispersion of local potassium; thus preventing swelling.

These two mechanisms are important for proper neuronal function due to the homeostatic processes distinctly provided by each mechanism to regulate neuronal excitability. Meaning, that neural excitability relies on the precise inward and outward flux of ions that are crucial for carrying out action potentials. The proper maintenance of potassium ion homeostasis is crucial to prevent neuronal hyperexcitability, or the overexcitability of a neuron to fire an action potential.

=== K_{ir} Channel (Inward-Rectifying K^{+} Channel) ===
The high permeability of glial cell membranes to potassium ions is a result of expression of high densities of potassium-selective channels with high open-probability at resting membrane potentials. Kir channels, potassium inward-rectifying channels, allow passage of potassium ions inward much more readily than outward. They also display a variable conductance that positively correlates with extracellular potassium concentration: the higher the potassium concentration outside the cell, the higher the conductance.

Kir channels are categorized into seven major subfamilies, Kir1 to Kir7, with a variety of gating mechanisms. Kir3 and Kir6 are primarily activated by intracellular G-proteins. Because they have a relatively low open-probability compared to the other families, they have little impact on potassium buffering. Kir1 and Kir7 are mainly expressed in epithelial cells, such as those in the kidney, choroid plexus, or retinal pigment epithelium, and have no impact on spatial buffering. Kir2, however, are expressed in brain neurons and glial cells. Kir4 and Kir5 are, along with Kir2, located in Muller glia and play important roles in potassium siphoning. There are some discrepancies among studies on expression of these channels in the stated locations.

=== Mechanism of Action for Inwardly-Rectifying K^{+} (K_{ir}) Channel Spatial Buffering ===
Potassium spatial buffering often encompasses a mechanism of action that is often seen in other physiological processes that involve potassium buffering, such as potassium siphoning in the retina.

The primary trigger for the action of potassium spatial buffering involves intense neuronal activity that releases potassium ions into the extracellular space, which increases the local extracellular potassium ion concentration ([K^{+}]_{o}).

The elevated [K^{+}]_{o} depolarizes the astrocyte membrane potential, which is primarily dictated by K^{+} equilibrium potential. Due to the high density of K_{ir}, astrocytes are highly permeable to K^{+} and take up K^{+} in the region of high concentration.

Due to the interconnection of astrocytes via gap junctions, and the formation of a syncytium, the K^{+} ions are redistributed and released intracellularly to areas with lower [K^{+}]_{o}.

=== Panglial syncytium ===
The panglial syncytium is a large network of interconnected glial cells, which are extensively linked by gap junctions. The panglial syncytium spreads through central nervous system where it provides metabolic and osmotic support, as well as ionic regulation of myelinated axons in white matter tracts. The three types of macroglial cells within network of panglial syncytium are astrocytes, oligodendrocytes, and ependymocytes. Originally it was believed that there was homologous gap junction between oligodendrocytes. It was later found through ultrastructural analysis that gap junctions do not directly link adjacent oligodendrocytes, rather it gap junctions with adjacent astrocytes, providing secondary pathway to nearby oligodendrocytes. With direct gap junction between myelin sheaths to surrounding astrocytes, excess potassium and osmotic water directly enters astrocyte syncytium, where it passively spreads downstream to astrocyte endfeet processes at capillaries and the glia limitans.

== Potassium siphoning ==
Potassium spatial buffering that occurs in the retina is called potassium siphoning, where the Muller cell is the principal glial cell type. Muller cells have important role in retinal physiology. It maintains retinal cell metabolism and are critical in maintaining potassium homeostasis in extracellular space during neuronal activity. Like cells responsible for spatial buffering, Muller cells are distinctively permeable to potassium ions through Kir channels. Like other glial cells, the high selectivity of Muller cell membranes to potassium ions is due to the high density of Kir channels. Potassium conductance is unevenly distributed in Muller cells. By focally increasing potassium ions along amphibian Muller cells and recording the resulting depolarization, the observed potassium conductance was concentrated in the endfoot process of 94% of the total potassium conductance localized to the small subcellular domain. The observation lead to hypothesis that excess potassium in extracellular space is "siphoned" by the Muller cells to the vitreous humor. Potassium siphoning is a specialized form of spatial buffering mechanisms where large reservoir of potassium ions is emptied into vitreous humor. Similar distribution pattern of Kir channels could be found in amphibians.

== History ==
Existence of potassium siphoning was first reported in 1966 study by Orkand et al. In the study, optic nerve of Necturus was dissected to document the long-distance movement of potassium after the nerve stimulation. Following the low frequency stimulation of .5 Hz at the retinal end of the dissected optic nerve, depolarization 1-2mV was measured at astrocytes at the opposite end of the nerve bundle, which was up to several millimeters from the electrode. With higher frequency stimulation, higher plateau of depolarization was observed. Therefore, they hypothesized that the potassium released to extracellular compartment during axonal activity entered and depolarized nearby astrocytes, where it was transported away by unfamiliar mechanism, which caused depolarization on astrocytes distant from site of stimulation. The proposed model was actually inappropriate since at the time neither gap junctions nor syncytium among glial cells were known, and optic nerve of Necturus are unmyelinated, which means that potassium efflux occurred directly into the periaxonal extracellular space, where potassium ions in extracellular space would be directly absorbed into the abundant astrocytes around axons.

== Diseases ==
In patients with Tuberous Sclerosis Complex (TSC), abnormalities occur in astrocyte that lead to pathogenesis of neurological dysfunction. TSC is a multisystem genetic disease with mutation in either TSC1 or TSC2 gene. This mutation results in disabling neurological symptoms such as mental retardation, autism, and seizures. Glial cells have important physiological roles of regulating neuronal excitability and preventing epilepsy. Astrocytes maintain homeostasis of excitatory substances, such as extracellular potassium, by immediate uptake through specific potassium channels and sodium potassium pumps. It is also regulated by potassium spatial buffering via astrocyte networks where astrocytes are coupled through gap junctions. Mutations in TSC1 or TSC2 gene often results in decreased expression of the astrocytic connexin protein, Cx43. With impairment in gap junction coupling between astrocytes, myriad of abnormalities in potassium buffering occurs which results in increased extracellular potassium concentration and may predispose to neuronal hyperexcitability and seizures. According to a study done on animal model, connexin43-deficient mice showed decreased threshold for the generation of epileptiform events. The study also demonstrated role of gap junction in accelerating potassium clearance, limiting potassium accumulation during neuronal firing, and relocating potassium concentrations.

Demyelinating Diseases of the central nervous system, such as Neuromyelitis Optica, often leads to molecular components of the panglial syncytium being compromised, which leads to blocking of potassium spatial buffering. Without mechanism of potassium buffering, potassium induced osmotic swelling of myelin occurs where myelins are destroyed and axonal salutatory conduction ceases.
