= Glioblast =

Type of cell in the embryonic neuroectoderm

A glioblast is a type of cell located in the embryonic neuroectoderm that has the ability to differentiate into several different types of neuroglia through asymmetric cell division.

It comes from a precursor (spongioblast). However, the latter may also differentiate into an ependymoblast.

Glioblasts differentiate into astrocytes and oligodendrocytes. Its tumor is called a glioblastoma, and is the most common type of central nervous system malignancy.

== See also ==
- Glioblastoma multiforme
- List of human cell types derived from the germ layers
