= Gliotransmitter =

Gliotransmitters are chemicals released from glial cells that facilitate communication between glial cells and neurons. They are usually induced from Ca^{2+} signaling, although recent research has questioned the role of Ca^{2+} in gliotransmitters and may require a revision of the relevance of gliotransmitters in neuronal signalling in general.

While gliotransmitters can be released from any glial cell, they are primarily released from astrocytes. Astrocytes rely on gap junctions for coupling, and are star-like in shape, which allows them to come into contact with many other synapses in various regions of the brain. Their structure also makes them capable of bidirectional signaling. It is estimated that astrocytes can make contact with over 100,000 synapses, allowing them to play an essential role in synaptic transmission. While gliotransmission primarily occurs between astrocytes and neurons, gliotransmission is not limited to these two cell types. Besides the central nervous system, gliotransmission also occurs among motor nerve terminals and Schwann cells in the peripheral nervous system. Another occurrence of gliotransmission takes place between glial cells in the retina, called Müller cells, and retinal neurons.

== Function ==
The word “glia”, derived from the Greek words γλία and γλοία ("glue"), illustrates the original belief among scientists that these cells play a passive role in neural signaling, being responsible only for neuronal structure and support within the brain. Glial cells cannot produce action potentials and therefore were not suspected as playing an important and active communicative role in the central nervous system, because synaptic transmission between neurons is initiated with an action potential. However, research shows that these cells express excitability with changes in the intracellular concentrations of Ca^{2+}. Gliotransmission occurs because of the ability of glial cells to induce excitability with variations in Ca^{2+} concentrations. Changes in the concentration of Ca^{2+} correlate with currents from NMDA receptor-mediated neurons which are measured in neighboring neurons of the ventrobasal (VB) thalamus. Because glial cells greatly outnumber neurons in the brain, accounting for over 70% of all cells in the central nervous system, gliotransmitters released by astrocytes have the potential to be very influential and important within the central nervous system, as well as within other neural systems throughout the body. These cells do not simply carry out functions of structural support, but can also take part in cell-to-cell communication with neurons, microglia, and other astrocytes by receiving inputs, organizing information, and sending out chemical signals. The Ca^{2+} signal from the astrocyte may also participate in controlling blood flow in the brain.

Gliotransmitters have been shown to control synapse development and regulate synaptic function, and their release can lead to paracrine actions on astrocytes as well as the regulation of neurotransmission. The definition of a gliotransmitter is not only defined by its presence in glial cells, but is determined by other factors, including its metabolic pathway. Also, the function of gliotransmitters varies according to their type, and each gliotransmitter has a specific target receptor and action.

Glial cells are important in hormonal and neuroendocrine function in the central nervous system and have an active role in sleep, cognition, synaptic function and plasticity, and promote remyelination and regeneration of injured nervous tissue. Other functions include the regulation of neurosecretory neurons and the release of hormones.

== Types of gliotransmitters ==
The major types of gliotransmitters released from astrocytes include glutamate and ATP.

Glutamate is the major excitatory neurotransmitter within the central nervous system that can also be defined as a gliotransmitter due to its ability to increase cytosolic Ca^{2+} concentrations in astrocytes. Its main target receptors include Kainate receptors, metabotropic glutamate receptors (mGluRs), and especially N-methyl D-aspartate receptors (NMDARs). NMDARs are glutamatergic receptors that play an important role in synaptic plasticity. Other functions of this gliotransmitter include synchronous depolarization, increasing the frequency of postsynaptic currents, and also increasing the likelihood of release and frequency of AMPA-receptor-dependent postsynaptic currents NMDARs are controlled by a voltage-gated channel receptor that is blocked by magnesium. Calcium can enter through NMDAR channels due to the cell's depolarization, which removes the magnesium block, and therefore activating these receptors.

ATP is a gliotransmitter that is released from astrocytes and restrains neuronal activity. ATP targets P2X receptors, P2Y, and A1 receptors. ATP has several functions as a gliotransmitter, including insertion of AMPA receptors into the postsynaptic terminal, paracrine activity through calcium waves in astrocytes, and suppression of synaptic transmission. Neuronal activity is controlled in the retina by the molecule's ability to hyperpolarize the neuron by converting from ATP to adenosine. ATP plays a role in facilitating neuroinflammation and remyelination by entering into the cell's extracellular space upon injury to activate purinergic receptors, which increase the production of gliotransmitters. The mechanism of ATP release from astrocytes is not well understood. Although it is unclear whether or not ATP-mediated gliotransmission is calcium-dependent, it is believed that ATP release is partly dependent on Ca^{2+} and SNARE proteins and involves multiple pathways, with exocytosis being the suggested method of release.

Other less common gliotransmitters include:

- homocysteic acid, an endogenous N-methyl-(D)-aspartic acid receptor (NMDAR) agonist
- taurine
- atrial natriuretic factor (ANF)
- tumor necrosis factor-alpha (TNF-alpha)
- GABA.

== Cell-to-cell communication ==
While neurotransmission is defined as information exchange between neurons, gliotransmission does not simply occur between astrocytes, but also between astrocytes, neurons and microglia. Between astrocytes, a “Ca^{[2+]} wave” of activity can be initiated, even when they are not in contact with each other, stimulating release of gliotransmitters.

Gliotransmission can also occur between two types of glial cells: astrocytes and microglia. Calcium waves within the intracellular matrix of the astrocyte can cause a response in microglia with the presence of ATP in the extracellular matrix. One study demonstrated that a mechanical stimulation caused astrocytes to release ATP, which in turn caused a delayed calcium response in microglia, suggesting that astrocyte-to-microglia communication could be mediated by ATP.

Communication between astrocytes and neurons is very important in neuronal function. The “tripartite synapse” is that most common example of intercellular communication between astrocytes and neurons, and involves the pre- and postsynaptic terminals of two neurons and one astrocyte. Astrocytes have the ability to modulate neuronal activity, either exciting or inhibiting synaptic transmission, depending on the type of gliotransmitter released, specifically glutamate, which typically has excitatory influence on neurons, or ATP, which has shown to typically inhibit certain presynaptic functions of neurons.

== Tripartite synapse ==
The fact that the release of gliotransmitters via elevations in calcium causes synaptic transmission leads to the idea of the “tripartite synapse.” The tripartite synapse involves the localization of astrocytes and synapses and is a concept of synaptic physiology in which there are three parts of a synapse: the presynaptic terminal, the postsynaptic terminal, and an astrocyte in between them. One model of the tripartite synapse shows the presynaptic and postsynaptic terminals lying adjacent to each other, which the astrocyte is wrapped around the postsynaptic terminal. However, localization and spatial distribution of the three elements of the tripartite synapse vary in different regions of the brain. Potassium channels between the astrocyte and the presynaptic terminal make it possible to release K+ ions and avoid accumulation after neuronal activity. Also, the release of neurotransmitters from presynaptic vesicles activates metabotropic receptors on the astrocyte, which then causes the astrocyte's release of gliotransmitters from the cell.

The astrocyte is bidirectional, meaning that it can communicate and exchange information with both pre- and postsynaptic elements. Communication is primarily controlled by the change in Ca^{2+} concentrations, causing excitability within the astrocyte. The capability of a human to respond to change in both the external and internal environment is increased due to the hormonal regulation of the tripartite synapse.

== Clinical significance ==
It is believed that an increase in gliotransmission may contribute to epilepsy, while a decrease may contribute to schizophrenia. Also, counting the number of astrocytes has proven to be useful; patients with depression are shown to have a lower astrocyte cell count. Further research and understanding of the correlation between gliotransmission and neurological disorders could lead to new targets for therapeutic treatment in the brain. Studies have also shown that increased and decreased stimulation of NMDARs, which is controlled by astrocytes, play a role in various neurodegenerative disorders. These include Alzheimer's, Parkinson's, and Huntington's diseases as well as schizophrenia, stroke, and epilepsy.

It is believed that certain disorders, particularly schizophrenia and epilepsy, may be partially caused by varying levels of gliotransmission and calcium excitability. One theory, called the glutamate hypothesis of schizophrenia, suggests that glutamate deficiency, which leads to the dysfunction of NMDARs at the presynaptic terminal, is believed to cause symptoms of schizophrenia. According to research, this hypofunctionality of NMDARs has been shown to be caused by lower amounts of gliotransmission facilitated by D-serine. More recently, it has been shown that D-serine and serine racemase occur almost exclusively in neurons, which do not support a role of D-serine as a gliotransmitter. The fact that cycloserine, which acts as an agonist for the NMDAR's binding site, is used in the treatment for patients with schizophrenia further supports the glutamate hypothesis. In the case of epilepsy, it is known that glutamate plays a role in synchronous depolarizations. This has led researchers to believe that excitation of epileptic discharges may be caused by the glutamate-mediated gliotransmission. Although that some studies show that the all excitations caused by gliotransmission lead to epileptic discharges, but it could possibly increase the intensity of length of epileptiform activity.

The 5 first mentioned transmitters are primarily excitatory and can thus lead to neural apoptosis through excitotoxicity when expressed at large amounts. From neurodegenerative diseases, there is evidence at least for Alzheimer's disease that point to increased glial activation and amount (both glia and astrocyte) which accompanies simultaneous decrease in the number of neurons. Excess quantities of the gliotransmitter TNF, documented in the cerebrospinal fluid in Alzheimer's disease, are hypothesized to play a role in the pathogenesis of this disorder, perhaps by dysregulating synaptic mechanisms which are modulated by TNF.

== See also ==
- Neurotransmitter
- Neurotransmission
