= Gemistocyte =

Swollen and reactive astrocyte

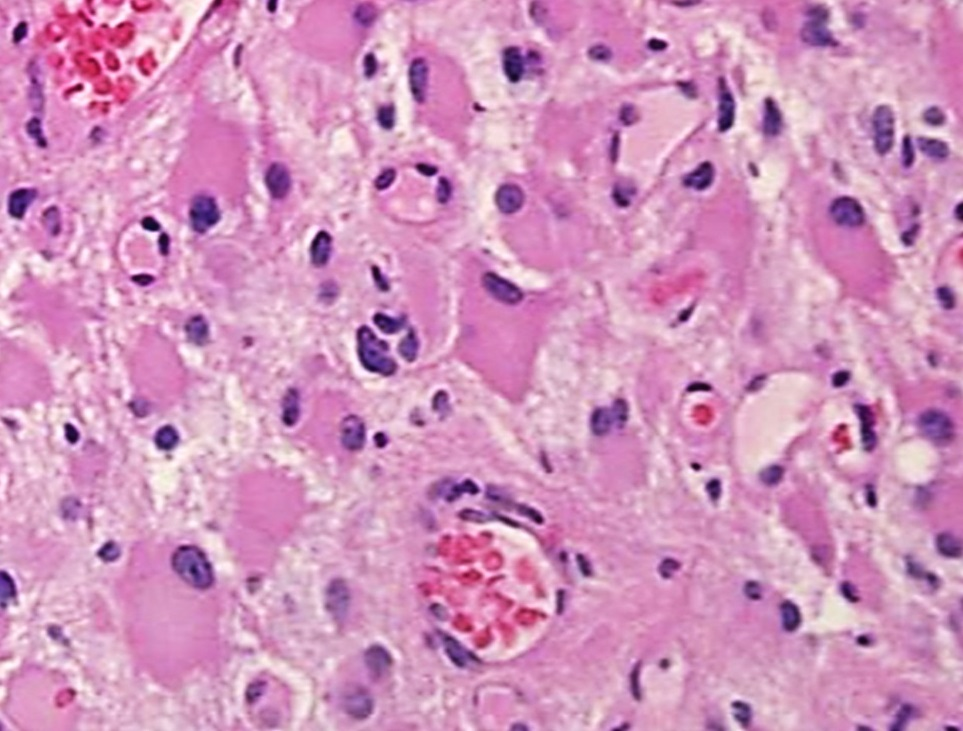
Histopathology of a gemistocytic astrocytoma. Neoplastic gemistocytes are angular shaped with abundant, glassy, eosinophilic cytoplasm and eccentric nuclei with distinct nucleoli.

A gemistocyte (/dʒɛˈmɪstəsaɪt/ jem-ISS-tə-syte; from Greek γέμιζω (gemizo) 'to fill up') is a swollen, reactive astrocyte.

Gemistocytes are glial cells that are characterized by billowing, eosinophilic cytoplasm and a peripherally positioned, flattened nucleus. Gemistocytes most often appear during acute injury; and eventually, shrink in size. They are usually present in anoxic-ischemic brains, which occurs when there is a complete lack of blood flow to the brain. Anoxic-ischemic brains usually occur in patients who have had cardiac arrest and prolonged attempt at cardiopulmonary resuscitation.

== Functions in the body ==
When present in anoxic-ischemic brains, gemistocytes are regularly encountered in glial neoplasms, also known as glioma, which is a type of tumor that occurs in the brain and spinal cord. Usually, gliomas begin in the glial cells that surround the nerve cells to help them function. Many gliomas exhibit cells that do not exist in normal brain tissue and are not seen in glial differentiation. Of these gliomas are astrocytomas, which is a type of cancer that occurs in the brain or spinal cord. The main role of astrocytes is to maintain brain homeostasis and neuronal metabolism. When the astrocytes become activated, they begin to respond to damage. Astrocyte activation, known as astrogliosis, responds to neurological trauma, infections, degradations, epilepsy, and tumorigenesis. Each neurological insult plays a major role in astrocyte activation and response to that specific damage. In some astrocytomas, the number of gemistocytes is extremely overwhelming, terming it a “gemistocytic astrocytoma.” Not only are gemistocytic cells present in astrocytomas, but they are also found in various glial tumor cells; for example, oligodendrogliomas, mixed oligoastrocytomas, glioblastomas, and pleomorphic xanthoastrocytomas. Gemistocytes are known to have a large cytoplasmic mass, long, branching processes, and increased cytoplasmic filaments. The cytoplasm of gemistocytes stains positive for glial fibrillary acidic protein, GFAP. While the intermediate filaments in gemistocytes are diffused throughout the cytoplasm, which indicates cellular disintegration. Within these different tumor types, the term “mini-gemistocytes” is used for smaller gemistocytes, that are usually found in oligodendroglial tumors. Mini-gemistocytes are found to have a very ordered arrangement of filaments throughout the cytoplasm, but may also transform into the end-state morphology of the larger gemistocytic cells. Studies have suggested that both classic gemistocytes and mini-gemistocytes show similar genetic variation to non-gemistocytic tumor cells. Mini-gemistocytes, usually found in oligodendroglial tumor cells, express gliofibrillary oligodendrocytes, or GFOCs, which are capable of transforming the mini-gemistoctyes into larger gemistocytes.

== Gliomas ==
A common form of a gemistocytic tumor, the gemistocytic astrocytes, consists of gemistocytes and giant cellular sarcoma. Gemistocytic astrocytomas are considered a specific type of diffuse astrocytic tumor that can be characterized by gemistocytes, and they usually appear during acute injury; after that, they gradually shrink in size. The gemistocytic cells can occur sporadically or locally in gliomas, which leads to the biology of the tumor. Astrocytes participating in gliosis are referred to as reactive astrocytes. Gemistocytic astrocytes are assumed to be intensely active cells because the astrocytomas evolve into glioblastomas. Tritiated thymidine can be used to determine the rate of cell division and cellular origins of gemistocytic astrocytes, leading to the discovery of the relationship between tumor anaplasia and degeneration. Tumor and brain tissue can be examined using autoradiographs, showing if the gemistocytic astrocytes could be labeled by the tritiated thymidine. Because there is a very large amount of cytoplasm, the giant gemistocytic astrocytes appear to be unable to incorporate tritiated thymidine, or unable to synthesize DNA, which suggests that gemistocytic astrocyte cells leave a proliferating pool after mitosis, and change to form gemistocytes. The original morphology of gemistocytes is uncertain, but it is known that they incorporate tritiated thymidine as either fibrillary or protoplasmic astrocytes. Gemistocytes multiply at a very slow rate, and their origin is very closely related to changes within the tumor. This speculates that gemistocytes show a very low proliferative activity, which means they grow at a very slow rate, and do not copy DNA well.

Normal central nervous system development involves differentiation from stem cells to progenitor cells, which can then transform into fully differentiated cells. All types of tumors are derived from either multipotent stem cells, or progenitor cells. Gene expression patterns are very likely to overlap for stem and progenitor cells and the tumors that are derived from them, but patterns are less likely to overlap for differentiated cells.

== Glioma grading ==
The glioma grading system distinguishes four grades for astrocytomas and two grades for oligoastrocytomas. Lower grade tumors tend to be well differentiated, have increased cell density and some cellular anomalies. Lower grade tumors already contain specific genetic alterations and may progressively accumulate more gene alterations that correlate with their tumor lineage, malignancy and progression to a higher grade.

Higher grade tumors are anaplastic, show signs of increased vessel density, elevated mitotic activity, and higher cellular density. Glioblastoma is a specific grade IV astrocytoma, showing vascular endothelial proliferation necrosis and very high cell density and atypias.

== Genetic markers ==
Genetic markers allow subclasses of glioma to be identified based on a molecular signature or gene expression patterns. Genetic markers contribute to more detailed elucidation of components of molecular pathways, such as, which oncogenes are activated and which cell cycle control elements are lost. The most common elements lost are tumor suppressor genes like p53, the retinoblastoma gene or phosphatase and tensin homologue.

== Clinical applications ==
Gliomas harboring gemistocytic cells are known to have a more aggressive clinical behavior due to the high proliferation rates of the non-gemistocytic cells which compete for nutrients and induce the gemistocytic morphology in other cells. Gemistocytes are suggested to be entrapped non-neoplastic glial cells that can be transformed into their specific phenotype due to the deprivation of nutrients when there is competition and increasing demand for surrounding tumor cells. Rapid progression of neoplastic glial cells are able to outgrow the vascular supply of the tumor which results in a metabolic disadvantage for the neoplastic cells causing metamorphosis to occur in the gemistocytic phenotype. Aside from the lack of proliferating activity of gemistocytic cells, their presence in gliomas appears to be a poor indication, and most tumors will rapidly become anaplastic astrocytomas.

== Disease ==
Gemistocytes are also found in some chronic diseases and within certain brain tumors, which suggests the presence of a long-lasting pathological reaction. Gemistocytic astrocytes can be observed in tissue damage, particularly Creutzefldt-Jakob disease and progressive multifocal leukoencephalopathy, which can be characterized by very large gemistocytic astrocytes. In the context of cancer (gemistocytic astrocytomas), gemistocytes are known to de-differentiate to a high grade (III or IV) glioma (i.e. glioblastoma multiforme) at a rapid pace, usually indicative of a poor prognosis.

== See also ==
- List of distinct cell types in the adult human body
