= Homocysteic acid =

- L-Homocysteic acid

Names
- IUPAC name (2S)-2-Amino-4-sulfobutanoic acid
- Other names Homocysteate

Identifiers
CAS Number	14857-77-3
3D model (JSmol)	Interactive image
ChEBI	CHEBI:132223
ChemSpider	154529
PubChem CID	177491
UNII	YW13F86W9W
CompTox Dashboard (EPA)	DTXSID101020602
- InChI: InChI=1S/C4H9NO5S/c5-3(4(6)7)1-2-11(8,9)10/h3H,1-2,5H2,(H,6,7)(H,8,9,10)/t3-/m0/s1 Key: VBOQYPQEPHKASR-VKHMYHEASA-N
- SMILES: C(CS(=O)(=O)O)[C@@H](C(=O)O)N

Properties
Chemical formula	C_{4}H_{9}NO_{5}S
Molar mass	183.18 g·mol^{−1}
Appearance	white or colorless solid
Melting point	261 °C (502 °F; 534 K)
- Except where otherwise noted, data are given for materials in their standard state (at 25 °C [77 °F], 100 kPa). Infobox references

Homocysteic acid is the organosulfur compound with the formula HO_{3}SCH_{2}CH_{2}CH(NH_{2})CO_{2}H. A white solid, it is sulfonic acid-containing non-proteinogenic amino acid. It is an analog of glutamic acid and is a potent NMDA receptor agonist. It is related to homocysteine, a by-product of methionine metabolism.

Homocysteic acid is prepared by the oxidation of homocystine with aqueous bromine.
