= Müller glia =

Glial cell type in the retina

3D animation of Müller cell processes (red) interconnected with a retinal microglia cell (green).

Müller glia, or Müller cells, are a type of retinal glial cells, first recognized and described by Heinrich Müller. They are found in the vertebrate retina, where they serve as support cells for the neurons, as all glial cells do. They are the most common type of glial cell found in the retina. While their cell bodies are located in the inner nuclear layer of the retina, they span across the entire retina.

The major role of the Müller cells is to maintain the structural and functional stability of retinal cells. This includes regulation of the extracellular environment via uptake of neurotransmitters and release of others, synthesis of retinoic acid, removal of debris and metabolic wastes, regulation of K^{+} levels, distribution of glycogen breakdown products for aerobic metabolism, electrical insulation of receptors and other neurons, and mechanical support of the neural retina.

== Development ==
Müller glia are derived developmentally from two distinct populations of cells. The Müller glia cell is the only retinal glial cell that shares a common cell lineage with retinal neurons. A subset of Müller glia has been shown to originate from neural crest cells. They are shown to be critical to the development of the retina in mice, serving as promoters of retinal growth and histogenesis, via a nonspecific esterase-mediated mechanism. Müller glia have also been implicated as guidepost cells for the developing axons of neurons in the chick retina. Studies using a zebrafish model of Usher syndrome have implicated a role for Müller glia in synaptogenesis, the formation of synapses.

== Neuronal support ==
Spatial relationship between Müller cells and microglia

As glial cells, Müller glia serve a secondary but important role to neurons. As such, they have been shown to serve as important mediators of neurotransmitter (acetylcholine and GABA specifically) degradation and maintenance of a favorable retinal microenvironment in turtles. Müller glia have also been shown to be important in the induction of the enzyme glutamine synthetase in chicken embryos, which is an important actor in the regulation of glutamine and ammonia concentrations in the central nervous system. Müller glia have been further identified as fundamental to the transmission of light through the vertebrate retina due to their unique funnel shape, orientation within the retina and more favorable physical properties.

== Role in retinal regeneration ==
Müller glia are currently being studied for their role in neural regeneration, a phenomenon which is not known to occur in humans. Studies of the regenerative properties of Müller glia in both the zebrafish and the chicken retina have been performed, with the exact molecular mechanism of regeneration remaining unclear. Further studies performed in mice have shown that overexpression of Ascl1 in Müller glia in conjunction with administration of a histone deacetylase inhibitor allowed for regeneration of retinal neurons from Müller glia. Studies in human models have demonstrated that Müller glia has the potential to serve as stem cells in the adult retina and are efficient rod photoreceptor progenitors.

Damage to retinal cells induces Müller cells to produce gliosis. The result of the response varies depending on the damage and the organism in which this damage occurs. It has been shown in zebrafish and mice that Müller glia undergo dedifferentiation into multipotent progenitor cells. The progenitor cell can then divide and differentiate into a number of retinal cell types, including photoreceptor cells, that may have been damaged during injury. Further research has shown that Müller glia can act as light collectors in the mammalian eye, analogous to the fiber optic plate, funneling light to the rod and cone photoreceptors.

== See also ==
- Radial glia
