= Lesional demyelinations of the central nervous system =

Diseases of the brain and spinal cord

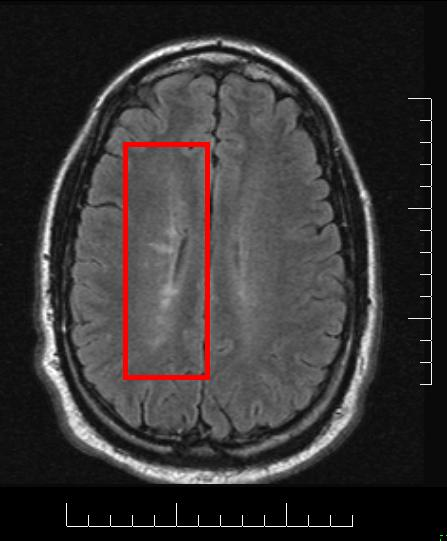
Dawson's Fingers appearing on an MRI scan

Multiple sclerosis and other demyelinating diseases of the central nervous system (CNS) produce lesions (demyelinated areas in the CNS) and glial scars or scleroses. They present different shapes and histological findings according to the underlying condition that produces them.

Demyelinating diseases are traditionally classified in two kinds: demyelinating myelinoclastic diseases and demyelinating leukodystrophic diseases. In the first group a normal and healthy myelin is destroyed by a toxic, chemical or autoimmune substance. In the second group, myelin is abnormal and degenerates. The second group was denominated dysmyelinating diseases by Poser Therefore, since Poser demyelinating diseases normally refers to the myelinoclastic part.

Demyelinating diseases of the CNS can be classified according to their pathogenesis into five non-exclusing categories: demyelination due to inflammatory processes, viral demyelination, demyelination caused by acquired metabolic derangements, hypoxic–ischaemic forms of demyelination and demyelination caused by focal compression.

== Non inflammatory demyelination ==
The four non-inflammatory possibilities are:

- viral demyelination,
- metabolic demyelination (Leukodystrophy and its sub-conditions, Adrenoleukodystrophy and Adrenomyeloneuropathy ),
- hypoxic–ischaemic forms of demyelination (Susac's syndrome, leukoaraiosis) and,
- demyelination caused by focal compression.

All these four types of demyelination are non-inflammatory and different to MS even if some leukoencephalopathies can produce similar lesions

== Lesions produced by CNS Inflammatory Demyelinating diseases (IDS) ==
Typical lesions are similar to those of MS, but there are four kinds of atypical inflammatory demyelinating lesions: Ring-like (antibody-mediated), megacystic (tumefactive), Balo-like, and diffusely-infiltrating lesions.

The list of the diseases that produce CNS demyelinating lesions is not complete, but it includes:

- Standard multiple sclerosis, the most known and extended variant.
- Devic's disease and neuromyelitis optica (NMO) (sometimes previously called optic-spinal MS)
- Acute disseminated encephalomyelitis or ADEM, a closely related disorder in which a known virus or vaccine triggers autoimmunity against myelin.
- Acute hemorrhagic leukoencephalitis, possibly a variant of Acute disseminated encephalomyelitis
- Balo concentric sclerosis, an unusual presentation of plaques forming concentric circles, which can sometimes get better spontaneously.
- Schilder disease or diffuse myelinoclastic sclerosis: is a rare disease that presents clinically as a pseudotumoural demyelinating lesion; and is more common in children.
- Marburg multiple sclerosis, an aggressive form, also known as malignant, fulminant or acute MS.
- Tumefactive Multiple sclerosis: lesions whose size is more than 2 cm, with mass effect, oedema and/or ring enhancement
- AntiMOG associated encephalomyelitis: Lesions similar to ADEM sometimes and to NMO some others. It is not normal, but can also appear like MS even with biopsy. These cases resemble MS pattern-II lesions. The demyelinating lesion presents T-cells and macrophages around blood vessels, with preservation of oligodendrocytes and signs of complement system activation.

=== Confluent vs. perivenous demyelination ===
A special characteristic that makes a difference between MS and the several kinds of ADEM is the structure of the lesions, being strictly perivenous in ADEM and showing a confluence around veins in MS. Given that ADEM can be multiphase sometimes and MS can appear in children, this characteristic is often considered as the line that separates both conditions.

The most typical of perivenous demyelination is ADEM

==== ADEM demyelination ====
ADEM can present plaque-like lesions which are indistinguishable from MS Nevertheless, ADEM White Matter appears intact under Magnetization Transfer MRI, while MS shows problems (See NAWM). Besides ADEM does not present "black holes" under MRI (zones with axonal damage) and lesions develop strictly around veins instead of the more relaxed rule for MS

==== NMO demyelination ====
As with MS, several patterns have been described inside NMO, but they are heterogeneous inside the same individual, reflecting stages in the lesion evolution:

- The first reflects complement deposition at the surface of astrocytes, associated with granulocyte infiltration and astrocyte necrosis
- demyelination, global tissue destruction and the formation of cystic, necrotic lesions (lesion type 2).
- Wallerian degeneration in lesion-related tracts (lesion type 3).
- Around active NMO lesions AQP4 may selectively be lost in the absence of aquaporin 1 (AQP1) loss or other structural damage (lesion type 4).
- Another pattern is characterized by clasmatodendrosis of astrocytes, defined by cytoplasmic swelling and vacuolation, beading and dissolution of their processes and nuclear alterations resembling apoptosis, which was associated with internalization of AQP4 and AQP1 and astrocyte apoptosis in the absence of complement activation. Such lesions give rise to extensive astrocyte loss, which may occur in part in the absence of any other tissue injury, such as demyelination or axonal degeneration (lesion type 5).
- Finally, lesions with a variable degree of astrocyte clasmatodendrosis are found, which show plaque-like primary demyelination that is associated with oligodendrocyte apoptosis, but with preservation of axons (lesion type 6).

Early active demyelinating NMO lesions may show complement within macrophages and oligodendrocyte apoptosis associated with a selective loss of minor myelin proteins, in addition to typical NMO features in a subset of active demyelinating NMO lesions

=== Confluent demyelination ===
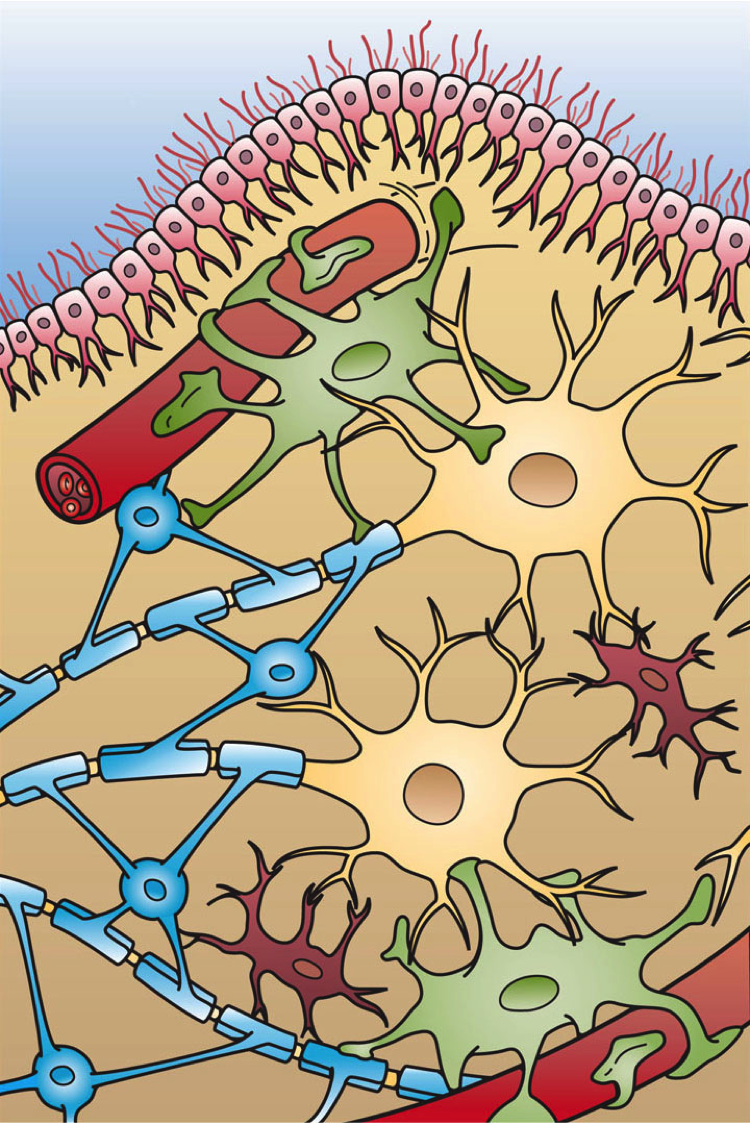
Illustration of the four different types of glial cells found in the central nervous system: ependymal cells, astrocytes, microglial cells, and oligodendrocytes

The demyelination around a vein is normally called "plaque". In MS plaques are reported to appear by coalescence of several confluent smaller demyelinations.

==== MS lesions ====
Normally MS lesions are small ovoid lesions, less than 2 cm. long, oriented perpendicular to the long axis of the brain's ventricles Often they are disposed surrounding a vein

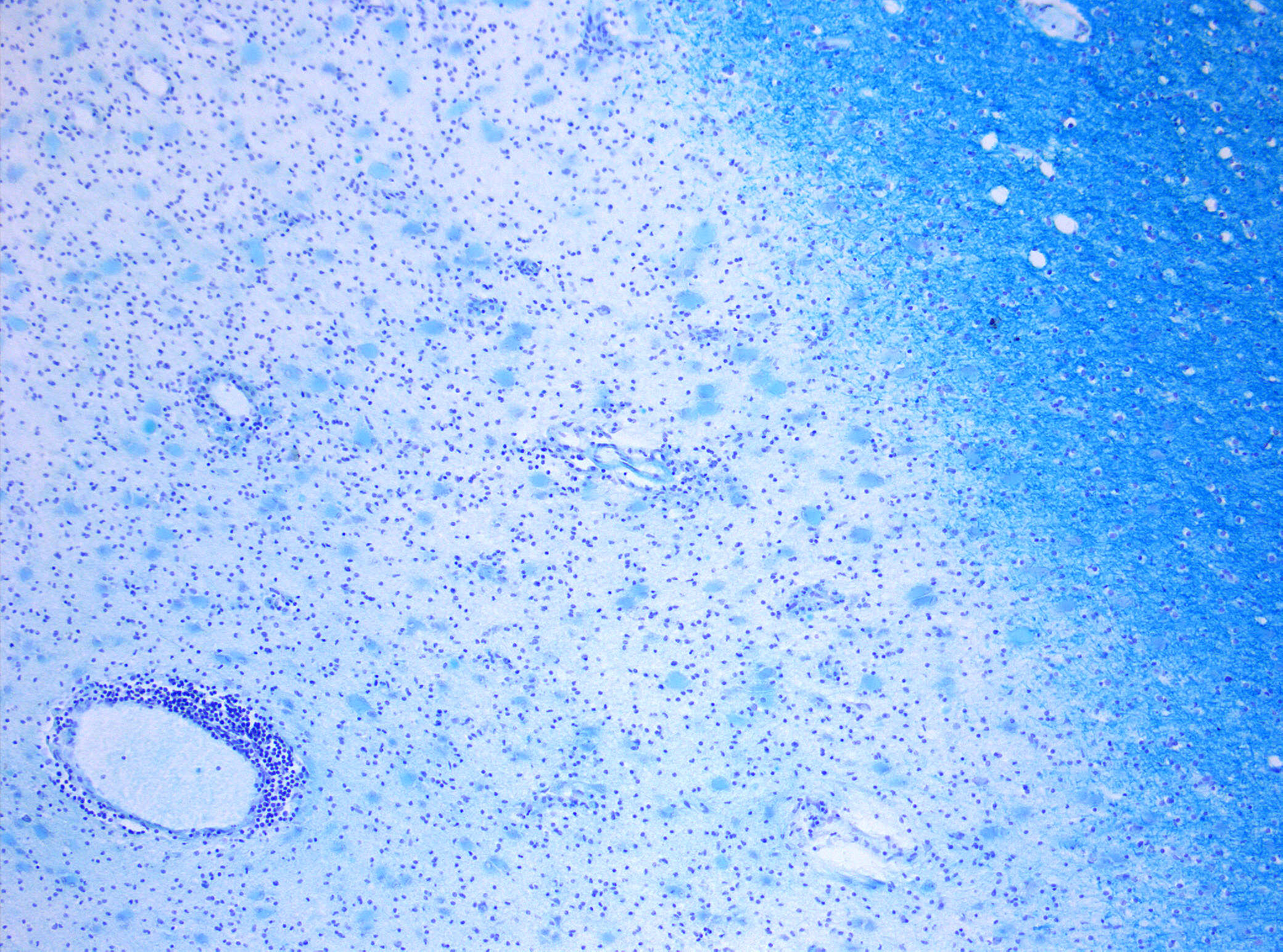
Demyelinization by MS. The Klüver-Barrera colored tissue show a clear decoloration in the area of the lesion (Original scale 1:100)

Active and pre-active lesions appear as hyperintense areas under T2-weighted MRI. Pre-active lesion here refers to lesions localized in the normal appearing white matter, without apparent loss of myelin but nevertheless showing a variable degree of oedema, small clusters of microglial cells with enhanced major histocompatibility complex class II antigen, CD45 and CD68 antigen expression and a variable number of perivascular lymphocytes around small blood vessels

Using high field MRI system, with several variants several areas show lesions, and can be spatially classified in infratentorial, callosal, juxtacortical, periventricular, and other white matter areas. Other authors simplify this in three regions: intracortical, mixed gray-white matter, and juxtacortical. Others classify them as hippocampal, cortical, and WM lesions, and finally, others give seven areas: intracortical, mixed white matter-gray matter, juxtacortical, deep gray matter, periventricular white matter, deep white matter, and infratentorial lesions. The distribution of the lesions could be linked to the clinical evolution

Post-mortem autopsies reveal that gray matter demyelination occurs in the motor cortex, cingulate gyrus, cerebellum, thalamus and spinal cord. Cortical lesions have been observed specially in people with SPMS but they also appear in RRMS and clinically isolated syndrome. They are more frequent in men than in women and they can partly explain cognitive deficits.

It is known that two parameters of the cortical lesions, fractional anisotropy (FA) and mean diffusivity (MD), are higher in patients than in controls. They are larger in SPMS than in RRMS and most of them remain unchanged for short follow-up periods. They do not spread into the subcortical white matter and never show gadolinium enhancement. Over a one-year period, CLs can increase their number and size in a relevant proportion of MS patients, without spreading into the subcortical white matter or showing inflammatory features similar to those of white matter lesions.

The first plausible explanation of their distribution was published by Dr. Schelling. He said:

The specific brain plaques of multiple sclerosis can only be caused by energetic venous back-jets set in motion by intermittent rises in the pressure in the large collecting veins of the neck, but especially of the chest..

But no problems with chest veins was ever found.

This morphologic appearance was named Dawson's fingers by Charles Lumsden, after the Scottish pathologist James Walker Dawson, who first defined the condition in 1916.

=== Dawson's fingers ===
"Dawson's fingers" is the name for the lesions around the ventricle-based brain veins of patients with multiple sclerosis and antiMOG associated encephalomyelitis

Though once thought to be specific of MS, it is known not to be the case.

The condition is thought to be the result of inflammation or mechanical damage by blood pressure around long axis of medular veins.

Dawson's fingers spread along, and from, large periventricular collecting veins, and are attributed to perivenular inflammation.

Lesions far away from these veins are known as Steiner's splashes.

Sometimes experimental autoimmune encephalomyelitis has been triggered in humans by accident or medical mistake. The damage in these cases fulfils all the pathological diagnostic criteria of MS and can therefore be classified as MS in its own right. The lesions were classified as pattern II in the Lucchinetti system. This case of human EAE also showed Dawson fingers.

=== Tumefactive demyelinating lesions ===
Demyelinating lesions whose size is larger than 2 cm. They normally appear together with normal MS lesions, situation described as tumefactive multiple sclerosis. When they appear alone, they are usually named "Solitary sclerosis", being more difficult to diagnose.

They look like intracranial neoplasms, and sometimes they get biopsied as suspected tumors. Proton MR spectroscopy can help in their diagnosis.

=== Demyelination process in MS ===
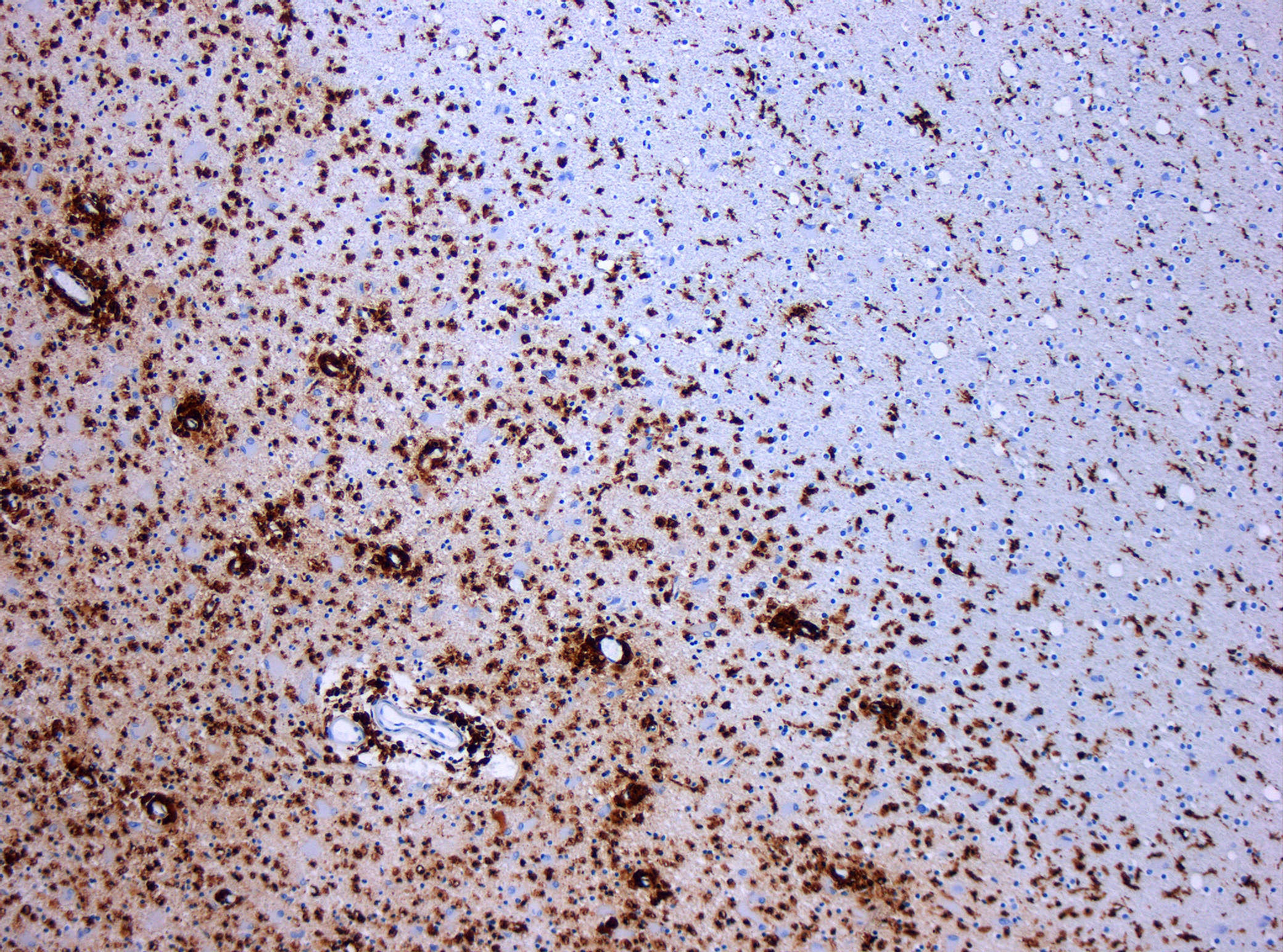
Demyelinization by MS. The CD68 colored tissue shows several Macrophages in the area of the lesion. Original scale 1:100

The hallmark of MS is the lesion, which appears mainly in the white matter and shows macrophage mediated demyelination, BBB breakdown, inflammation and axon transection.

==== NAWM development ====
Demyelinating lesions begin with the appearance of some areas named NAWM (normal appearing white matter) which despite its name, is abnormal in several parameters. These areas show axonal transections and stressed oligodendrocytes (the cells responsible for maintaining the myelin), and randomly, they show clusters of activated microglia named pre-active lesions. These pre-lesions normally resolve themselves, though sometimes they spread towards a capilar vein.

==== BBB breakdown ====
This is followed by the blood–brain barrier (BBB) breakdown. BBB is a tight vascular barrier between the blood and brain that should prevent the passage of antibodies through it, but in MS patients it does not work. For unknown reasons special areas appear in the brain and spine, followed by leaks in the blood–brain barrier where immune cells infiltrate. This leads to the entrance of macrophages into the CNS, triggering the beginning of an immune-mediated attack against myelin. Gadolinium cannot cross a normal BBB and, therefore, Gadolinium-enhanced MRI is used to show BBB breakdowns.

==== Immune mediated attack ====
After the BBB breakdown, the immune-mediated attack against myelin happens. T cells, are a kind of lymphocyte that plays an important role in the body's defenses. The T cells recognize myelin as foreign and attack it, explaining why these cells are also called "autoreactive lymphocytes". Demyelination, further inflammation and axonal transection are the result.

The attack of myelin starts inflammatory processes, which triggers other immune cells and the release of soluble factors like cytokines and antibodies. Further breakdown of the blood–brain barrier, in turn cause a number of other damaging effects such as swelling, activation of macrophages, and more activation of cytokines and other destructive proteins.

Astrocytes can heal partially the lesion leaving a scar. These scars (sclerae) are the known plaques or lesions usually reported in MS. A repair process, called remyelination, takes place in early phases of the disease, but the oligodendrocytes are unable to completely rebuild the cell's myelin sheath. Repeated attacks lead to successively less effective remyelinations, until a scar-like plaque is built up around the damaged axons.

According to the view of most researchers, a special subset of lymphocytes, called T helper cells, specifically Th1 and Th17, play a key role in the development of the lesion. Under normal circumstances, these lymphocytes can distinguish between self and non-self. However, in a person with MS, these cells recognize healthy parts of the central nervous system as foreign and attack them as if they were an invading virus, triggering inflammatory processes and stimulating other immune cells and soluble factors like cytokines and antibodies. Many of the myelin-recognizing T cells belong to a terminally differentiated subset called co-stimulation-independent effector-memory T cells. Recently other type of immune cells, B Cells, have been also implicated in the pathogenesis of MS and in the degeneration of the axons.

The axons themselves can also be damaged by the attacks. Often, the brain is able to compensate for some of this damage, due to an ability called neuroplasticity. MS symptoms develop as the cumulative result of multiple lesions in the brain and spinal cord. This is why symptoms can vary greatly between different individuals, depending on where their lesions occur.

==== Lesion recovery ====
Under laboratory conditions, stem cells are quite capable of proliferating and differentiating into remyelinating oligodendrocytes; it is therefore suspected that inflammatory conditions or axonal damage somehow inhibit stem cell proliferation and differentiation in affected areas It is possible to predict how much and when lesion will recover

Related to this, it was found in 2016 that neural cells of primary progressive patients (PPMS) do have some kind of problem to protect neuroprotection against demyelination or oligodendrocytes, compared to healthy subjects. Some genetics seem to underlie the problem as this was shown using Induced pluripotent stem cell (iPSC) as neural progenitor cells (NPC)

=== Demyelination patterns in standard MS ===
Four different damage patterns, known as Lassmann patterns, have been identified by her team in the scars of the brain tissue in multiple sclerosis, and they are used sometimes as a basis for describing lesions in other demyelinating diseases.

Pattern I
The scar presents T-cells and macrophages around blood vessels, with preservation of oligodendrocytes, but no signs of complement system activation.
Pattern II
The scar presents T-cells and macrophages around blood vessels, with preservation of oligodendrocytes, as before, but also signs of complement system activation can be found. Though this pattern could be considered similar to damage seen in NMO, some authors report no AQP4 damage in pattern II lesions
Pattern III
The scars are diffuse with inflammation, distal oligodendrogliopathy and microglial activation. There is also loss of myelin-associated glycoprotein (MAG). The scars do not surround the blood vessels, and in fact, a rim of preserved myelin appears around the vessels. There is evidence of partial remyelinization and oligodendrocyte apoptosis. For some researchers this pattern is an early stage of the evolution of the others.
Pattern IV
The scar presents sharp borders and oligodendrocyte degeneration, with a rim of normal appearing white matter. There is a lack of oligodendrocytes in the center of the scar. There is no complement activation or MAG loss.

The meaning of this fact is controversial. For some investigation teams it means that MS is a heterogeneous disease. Others maintain that the shape of the scars can change with time from one type to other and this could be a marker of the disease evolution. Anyway, the heterogeneity could be true only for the early stage of the disease. Some lesions present mitochondrial defects that could distinguish types of lesions. Currently antibodies to lipids and peptides in sera, detected by microarrays, can be used as markers of the pathological subtype given by brain biopsy.

After some debate among research groups, currently the heterogeneity hypothesis looks like accepted

== See also ==
- Pathophysiology of multiple sclerosis
- Internal cerebral veins
- Great cerebral vein
- Circle of Willis
