= Inflammatory demyelinating diseases =

Human disease

Inflammatory demyelinating diseases (IDDs), sometimes called Idiopathic (IIDDs) due to the unknown etiology of some of them, are a heterogenous group of demyelinating diseases - conditions that cause damage to myelin, the protective sheath of nerve fibers - that occur against the background of an acute or chronic inflammatory process. IDDs share characteristics with and are often grouped together under Multiple Sclerosis. They are sometimes considered different diseases from Multiple Sclerosis, but considered by others to form a spectrum differing only in terms of chronicity, severity, and clinical course.

Multiple sclerosis for some people is a syndrome more than a single disease. As of 2019, three auto-antibodies have been found in atypical MS giving birth to separate diseases: Anti-AQP4 diseases, Anti-MOG and Anti-NF spectrums. A LHON-associated MS has also been reported, and in addition there have been inconclusive reports of TNF-α blockers inducing demyelinating disorders.

The subject is under intense research and the list of MS autoantibodies is expected to grow in the near future.

== Separated variants ==
As of 2014 several previous MS variants had been separated from MS after the discovery of a specific auto-antibody. Those autoantibodies were anti-AQP4, anti-MOG and some anti-Neurofascins.

These conditions can appear as Neuromyelitis optica (NMO), and its associated "spectrum of disorders" (NMOSD), currently considered a common syndrome for several separated diseases but with some still idiopathic subtypes. Some researchers think that there could exist an overlapping between Anti-NMDA receptor encephalitis cases and neuromyelitis optica or acute disseminated encephalomyelitis.

=== Anti-AQP4 spectrum ===
See Anti-AQP4 diseases

Originally found in neuromyelitis optica, this autoantibody has been associated with other conditions. Its current spectrum is as following:

- Seropositive Devic's disease, according to the diagnostic criteria described above.
- Limited forms of Devic's disease, such as single or recurrent events of longitudinally extensive myelitis, and bilateral simultaneous or recurrent optic neuritis.
- Asian optic-spinal MS - this variant can present brain lesions like MS.
- Longitudinally extensive myelitis or optic neuritis associated with systemic autoimmune disease.
- Optic neuritis or myelitis associated with lesions in specific brain areas such as the hypothalamus, periventricular nucleus, and brainstem.
- Some cases of tumefactive multiple sclerosis

=== Anti-MOG spectrum ===
See Anti-MOG associated encephalomyelitis

Anti-MOG associated spectrum, often clinically presented as an anti-MOG autoimmune encephalomyelitis, but can also appear as negative NMO or atypical multiple sclerosis.

The presence of anti-MOG autoantibodies has been associated with the following conditions

- Some cases of aquaporin-4-seronegative neuromyelitis optica: NMO derived from an antiMOG associated encephalomyelitis,
- Some cases of acute disseminated encephalomyelitis, specially the recurrent ones (MDEM)
- Some cases of McDonalds-positive multiple sclerosis
- isolated optic neuritis or transverse myelitis
- Recurrent optic neuritis. The repetition of an idiopatic optic neuritis is considered a distinct clinical condition, and it has been found to be associated with anti-MOG autoantibodies
  - CRION (Chronic relapsing inflammatory optic neuritis): A distinct clinical entity from other inflammatory demyelinating diseases. Some reports consider it a form of Anti-MOG encephalomyelitis and the most recent ones consider it the main phenotype of the anti-MOG spectrum

The anti-mog spectrum in children is equally variated: Out of a sample of 41 children with MOG-antibodies 29 had clinical NMOSD (17 relapsing), 8 had ADEM (4 relapsing with ADEM-ON), 3 had a single clinical event CIS, and 1 had a relapsing tumefactive disorder. Longitudinal myelitis was evident on MRI in 76[percent]. It has also been noted that percentage of children with anti-mog antibodies respect a demyelinating sample is higher than for adults

Some NMO patients present double positive for autoantibodies to AQP4 and MOG. These patients have MS-like brain lesions, multifocal spine lesions and retinal and optic nerves atrophy.

=== Anti-neurofascin spectrum ===
See Anti-neurofascin demyelinating diseases

Some anti-neurofascin demyelinating diseases were previously considered a subtype of Multiple Sclerosis but now they are considered a separate entity, as it happened before to anti-MOG and anti-AQP4 cases. Around 10% of MS cases are now thought to be anti-Neurofascin disease in reality.

Anti-neurofascin autoantibodies have been reported in atypical cases of MS and CIDP, and a whole spectrum of Anti-neurofascin demyelinating diseases has been proposed.

Some cases of CIDP are reported to be produced by auto-antibodies against several neurofascin proteins. These proteins are present in the neurons and four of them have been reported to produce disease: NF186, NF180, NF166 and NF155.

Antibodies against Neurofascins NF-155 can also appear in MS and NF-186 could be involved in subtypes of MS yielding an intersection between both conditions.

Summarising, autoantibodies against several neurofascins can produce MS: neurofascin186 (NF186), neurofascin155 (NF155), contactin 1 (CNTN1), contactin associated protein 1 (CASPR1) and gliomedin. All of them nodal and paranodal proteins.

=== Demyelination associated with anti-TNF therapy ===
Several anti-TNF drugs like adalimumab are commonly prescribed by a number of autoimmune conditions. Some of them have been reported to produce a CNS-demyelination compatible with standard MS. Several other monoclonal antibodies like pembrolizumab, nivolumab and infliximab have been also reported to produce MS as an adverse event. Nevertheless, it is not so similar as reported in the previous references.

The reactions following Anti-TNF therapy have been diverse according to the source of the disease. Some of these cases can be classify as ADEM, using the confluent demyelination as barrier between both conditions.

In most cases, the damage fulfills all pathological diagnostic criteria of MS and can therefore be classified as MS in its own right. The lesions were classified as pattern II in the Lassman/Lucchinetti system. Some lesions also showed Dawson fingers, which is supposed to be a MS-only feature.

These recent problems with artificial anti-TNF-α autoimmunity also point to the possibility of tumor necrosis factor alpha involvement in some multiple sclerosis variants.

=== LHON-associated MS ===
Also a previous subtype of MS associated to LHON has been described (LHON-MS) It is a presentation of LHON with MS-like CNS damage.

It used to satisfy McDonalds definition for MS, but after demonstration that LHON can produce this kind of lesions, the "no better explanation" requirement does not hold anymore. It is not due to auto-antibodies, but to defective mitochondria instead.

The symptoms of this higher form of the disease include loss of the brain's ability to control the movement of muscles, tremors, and cardiac arrhythmia. and the lack of muscular control.

=== Relapsing anti-NMDAR encephalitis ===
Atypical Anti-NMDA receptor encephalitis (a kind of Autoimmune encephalitis) can appear in the form of relapsing optic neuritis.

== Variants still idiopathic ==
Apart from the previously cited spectrums (Anti-AQP4 diseases, Anti-MOG, and Anti-NF) there is a long list of MS variants, with possibly different pathogenesis, which are still idiopathic and considered inside the MS-spectrum.

=== Pseudotumefactive variants ===
Most atypical variants appear as tumefactive or pseudotumefactive variants (lesions whose size is more than 2 cm (0.79 in), with mass effect, oedema and/or ring enhancement) Some cases of the following have shown anti-MOG auto-antibodies and therefore they represent MS cases only partially.

- Acute disseminated encephalomyelitis or ADEM, a closely related disorder in which a known virus or vaccine triggers autoimmunity against myelin. Around 40% of the ADEM cases are due to an "anti-MOG associated encephalomyelitis". It includes Acute hemorrhagic leukoencephalitis, possibly a variant of Acute disseminated encephalomyelitis
- Marburg multiple sclerosis, an aggressive form, also known as malignant, fulminant or acute MS, currently reported to be closer to anti-MOG associated ADEM than to standard MS. and is sometimes considered a synonym for Tumefactive multiple sclerosis
- Balo concentric sclerosis, an unusual presentation of plaques forming concentrenic circles, which can sometimes get better spontaneously.
- Schilder disease or diffuse myelinoclastic sclerosis: is a rare disease that presents clinically as a pseudotumoural demyelinating lesion; and is more common in children.
- Solitary sclerosis: This variant was proposed (2012) by Mayo Clinic researchers. though it was also reported by other groups more or less at the same time. It is defined as isolated demyelinating lesions which produce a progressive myelopathy similar to primary progressive MS.

=== Atypical lesion location variants ===
Also the location of the lesions can be used to classify variants:

==== Myelocortical multiple sclerosis ====
Myelocortical multiple sclerosis (MCMS), proposed variant with demyelination of spinal cord and cerebral cortex but not of cerebral white matter. Several atypical cases could belong here. See the early reports of MCMS.

==== AQP4-negative Optic-spinal MS ====
Real Optic-spinal MS (OSMS) without anti-AQP4 antibodies, has been consistently reported, and it is classified into the MS spectrum.

OSMS has its own specific immunological biomarkers The whole picture is under construction and several reports exists about overlapping conditions.

==== Pure spinal MS ====
Pure spinal multiple sclerosis: Patients with clinical and paraclinical features suggestive of cord involvement of multiple sclerosis (MS)-type albeit not rigidly fulfilling the McDonald criteria Some inflammatory conditions are associated with the presence of scleroses in the CNS. Optic neuritis (monophasic and recurrent) and Transverse myelitis (monophasic and recurrent)

==== LHON associated MS ====
LHON associated MS (LHON-MS), a presentation of LHON with MS-like CNS damage, and therefore a subtype of MS according to McDonalds definition.

=== Atypical OCB variants ===
Also different classifications by body fluid biomarkers is possible:

- Oligoclonal negative MS: Some reports point to the possibility of a different pathogenesis They represent around 5% of the cases which is suspected to be immunogenetically different. Their evolution is better than standard MS patients,
- Oligoclonal IgM positive MS, with immunoglobulin-M Bands (IgM-Bands), which accounts for a 30-40% of the MS population and has been identified as a predictor of MS severity. It has been reported to have a poor response to interferon-beta but a better response to glatimer acetate instead
- OCB's types: OCBs are made up of activated B-cells. It seems that the molecular targets for the OCB's are patient-specific.

=== Radiologically atypical variants ===
Inside well defined MS (Lesions disseminated in time and space with no other explanation) there are atypical cases based in radiological or metabolic criteria. A four-groups classification has been proposed:

- Tumefactive demyelinating lesion (TDL)-onset MS
- Acute disseminated encephalomyelitis (ADEM)-like MS
- Multiple sclerosis with cavitary lesions: Atypical multiple sclerosis cases similar to vanishing white matter disease but etiologically different from both. Lesions similar to vanishing white matter disease
- Leukodystrophy-like MS.

Other radiological classification of atypical lesions proposes the following four subtypes:

- infiltrative
- megacystic
- Baló-like
- ring-like lesions

=== Atypical clinical courses ===
In 1996, the US National Multiple Sclerosis Society (NMSS) Advisory Committee on Clinical Trials in Multiple Sclerosis (ACCTMS) standardized four clinical courses for MS (Remitent-Recidivant, Secondary Progressive, Progressive-Relapsing and Primary progressive). Later, some reports state that those "types" were artificially made up trying to classify RRMS as a separate disease so that the number of patients was low enough to get the interferon approved by the FDA under the orphan drugs act. Revisions in 2013 and 2017 removed the Progressive-Relapsing course and introduced CIS as a variety/course/status of MS, establishing the actual classification (CIS, RRMS, SPMS and PPMS). Nevertheless, these types are not enough to predict the responses to medications and several regulatory agencies use additional types in their recommendations like Highly active MS, Malignant MS, Aggressive MS or Rapidly progressive MS.

==== Highly Active MS ====
As of 2019, HAMS is defined as an RRMS phenotype with one or more of the following characteristics:

1. DSS scale of 4 points at 5 years of onset of the disease
2. Multiple relapses (two or more) with incomplete recovery in the ongoing year
3. More than 2 brain magnetic resonance imaging (MRI) studies demonstrating new lesions or increase in the size of the lesions in T2, or lesions that enhance with gadolinium despite treatment (Clinical case 1 and 2).
4. No response to treatment with one or more DMTs for at least one year.

There is a group of patients who have defined clinical and radiological risk factors that predict a behavior of greater risk of conversion to HAMS, without having the diagnostic criteria of HAMS in a first clinical attack have predictors of high risk.

Some other previous authors have used other definitions like:

- High activity according to 2017 definition of activity
- Rapid accumulation of physical and cognitive deficit, despite treatment with DMT's.
- Being eligible for immunoablative therapy followed by autologous haematopoietic stem cell transplantation (aHSCT) because of a) the failure of conventional treatment, b) frequent and severe (disabling) relapses, or c) MRI activity (new T2 or gadolinium-enhancing lesions).

==== Malignant MS ====
See malignant multiple sclerosis

Occasionally, the term 'malignant' MS (MMS) has been used to describe aggressive phenotypes of MS, but this is another ambiguous term that—despite wide usage—means different things to different people.

In 1996, the US National MS Society (NMSS) Advisory Committee on Clinical Trials in Multiple Sclerosis, "malignant MS" was also included, namely, "disease with a rapid progressive course, leading to significant disability in multiple neurologic systems or death in a relatively short time after disease onset."

Many authors reserve the term malignant for fulminant forms of MS that deteriorate so rapidly from the outset as to be almost monophasic, and result in death within months to a few years. One such example is the Marburg variant of MS, which is classically characterized by extensive necrotic and/or tumefactive lesions with mass effect.

Despite recent (and increasing) emphasis on early detection of patients with aggressive MS, the original definition of MMS was not modified by the NMSS Advisory Committee in its latest publication in 2013 (Lublin et al., 2014).

==== Aggressive MS ====
Common to all definitions is the early, unexpected acquisition of disability followed by frequent relapses and highly active disease seen on MRI.

One definition can be based on EDSS score and the time to develop secondary progressive MS (SPMS) (Menon et al., 2013).

No consensus exists on the speed of progression or degree of disability sufficient for aggressive MS, but some assume that reaching an EDSS score of 6 points probably represents an upper limit beyond which the risk-benefit ratio for an aggressive treatment is unfavourable.

Pragmatically, AMS has been defined as any type of MS that is associated with repeated severe attacks and accelerated accrual of disability—put more simply, "rapidly progressive" MS.

==== Rapidly progressive multiple sclerosis ====
This kind of MS was previously reported to behave different that the standard progressive course, being linked to Connexin 43 autoantibodies with pattern III lesions (distal oligodendrogliopathy) and being responsive to plasma exchange

In very rapidly progressive multiple sclerosis the use of immunosuppressive therapy (mitoxantrone/cyclophosphamide), rituximab, autologous haematopoietic stem cell therapy or combination therapy should be considered carefully.

== Under research ==
Some auto-antibodies have been found consistently across different MS cases but there is still no agreement on their relevance:

- HEPACAM: A cross-reactivity between HepaCam (GlialCam) and EBNA1 has been reported as of 2022 on 25% of MS cases
- Anti-kir4.1: A KIR4.1 multiple sclerosis variant was reported in 2012 and later reported again, which could be considered a different disease (as Devic's disease did before), and can represent up to a 47% of the MS cases
- Anoctamin 2: Auto-antibodies against anoctamin-2 (ANO-2), one of the ion-channel proteins, have been reported consistently since 2013
  - This finding is not universal. Most of the MS patients do not show auto-antibodies against ANO-2. Therefore, this points toward an ANO2 autoimmune sub-phenotype in MS.
  - Later reports point towards a mimicry between ANO-2 and EBV-EBNA-1 protein
- Anti-NMDAR autoantibodies: There is an overlap between cases of Anti-NMDA receptor encephalitis and MS, NMO and ADEM. It also could be a confusion with Anti-NMDA receptor encephalitis in the early stages but there are also anti-NMDAR reported cases that evolve to McDonalds MS
- Anti-Flotilin spectrum: The proteins Flotillin 1 and flotillin 2 have been recently identified as target antigens in some patients with multiple sclerosis. First 14 cases were reported together in the first report, and 3 new cases were reported later inside a cohort of 43 patients.
- Mutations in GJB1 coding for connexin 32, a gap junction protein expressed in Schwann cells and oligodendrocytes, that usually produce Charcot-Marie-Tooth disease. In some cases also MS (as defined by McDonalds criteria) can appear in these patients.
- Also an OPA1 variant exists.
- There exist some reports by Drs. Aristo Vojdani, Partha Sarathi Mukherjee, Joshua Berookhim, and Datis Kharrazian of an aquaporin-related multiple sclerosis, related to vegetal aquaporin proteins.
- Auto-antibodies against histones have been reported to be involved.
- Anti-AQP1 could be involved in atypical MS and NMO
- N-type calcium channel antibodies can produce cognitive relapses mimicking MS related cognitive decline, and may coexist with MS.
- MLKL-MS: Mixed lineage kinase domain like pseudokinase (MLKL) related MS - A preliminary report has pointed out evidence of a novel neurodegenerative spectrum disorder related to it.

Other auto-antibodies can be used to establish a differential diagnosis from very different diseases like Sjögren syndrome which can be separated by Anti–Calponin-3 autoantibodies.

The correlation between this genetic mutation and MS was challenged but in 2018 has been replicated by an independent team. Notice that this results do not refer to general MS.

In general, NMO-like spectrum without known auto-antibodies is considered MS. Principal component analysis of these cases show 3 different kinds of antibody-negative patients. The metabolite discriminators of RRMS and Ab-NMOSD suggest that these groupings have some pathogenic meaning.

As MS is an active field for research, the list of auto-antibodies is not closed nor definitive. For example, some diseases like Autoimmune GFAP Astrocytopathy or variants of CIDP that affects the CNS (CIDP is the chronic counterpart of Guillain–Barré syndrome) could be included. Autoimmune variants peripheral neuropathies or progressive inflammatory neuropathy could be in the list assuming the autoimmune model for MS, together with a rare demyelinating lesional variant of trigeminal neuralgia and some NMDAR Anti-NMDA receptor encephalitis.

Venous induced demyelination has also been proposed as a hypothetical MS variant produced by CCSVI, Susac's syndrome and Neuro-Behçet's disease (MS has an important vascular component), myalgic encephalomyelitis (aka chronic fatigue syndrome).

Also leukoaraiosis can produce lesions disseminated in time and space, condition usually sufficient in the MS definition. Maybe two sub-conditions of Leukodystrophy: Adrenoleukodystrophy and Adrenomyeloneuropathy could be in the list. Specially interesting is X-linked adrenoleukodystrophy (X-ALD or CALD).

== Genetic types ==
Different behaviour has been reported according to the presence of different HLA genes.

=== HLA DRB3*02:02 patients ===
In HLA DRB3 cases, autoimmune reactions against the enzyme GDP-L-fucose synthase has been reported The same report points that the autoimmune problem could derive from the gut microbiota.

HLA-DRB1*15:01 has the strongest association with MS.

HLA-DRB1*04:05, HLA-B*39:01, and HLA-B*15:01 are associated with independent MS susceptibility and HLA-DQβ1 position 9 with phenylalanine had the strongest effect on MS susceptibility.

Another possible type is one with auto-antibodies against GDP-L-fucose synthase. In HLA-DRB3*02:02 patients, autoimmune reactions against the enzyme GDP-L-fucose synthase has been reported The same report points that the autoimmune problem could derive from the gut microbiota.

=== Rapidly progressive multiple sclerosis ===
See malignant multiple sclerosis

This is a specially aggressive clinical course of progressive MS that has been found to be caused by a special genetic variant. It is due to a mutation inside the gene NR1H3, an arginine to glutamine mutation in the position p.Arg415Gln, in an area that codifies the protein LXRA.

== Primary progressive variants ==
Some researchers propose to separate primary progressive MS from other clinical courses. PPMS, after recent findings seem to point that it is pathologically a very different disease.

Some authors think since long ago that primary progressive MS should be considered a disease different from standard MS, and it was also proposed that PPMS could be heterogeneous

Clinical variants have been described. For example, Late Onset MS. It is due to a mutation inside the gene NR1H3, an arginine to glutamine mutation in the position p.Arg415Gln, in an area that codifies the protein LXRA.

For the rest of the progressive cases, it has been found that the lesions are diffuse instead of the normal focal ones, and are different under MR spectroscopy. RRMS and PPMS patients also show differences on the retinal layers yields examined under OCT.

Some authors have proposed a dual classification of PPMS, according to the shape of edges of the scars, in MS-like and ADEM-like Proteomic analysis have shown that two proteins, Secretogranin II and Protein 7B2, in CSF can be used to separate RRMS from PPMS

Recently, the hypothesis of PPMS being apart from RRMS/SPMS is taken further credibility due that it was shown that CSF from PPMS patients can carry the disease to other animals, producing neurodegeneration in mice and that Normal Appearing White Matter (NAWM) structure is also different

The predominant lesions in PPMS are slowly expanding lesions with T cells, microglial, and macrophage-associated demyelination in close similar to pattern I demyelination

As of 2019 it has been found that the profile of T-cells is different in PPMS and SPMS

== Clinical situations inside standard MS ==
MS can be considered among the acquired demyelinating syndromes with a multiphasic instead of monophasic behaviour. Multiple sclerosis has a prodromal stage in which an unknown underlying condition, able to damage the brain, is present, but no lesion has still developed.

MS is usually classified in clinical types, though they are unrelated to the underlying pathology. Some critical reports say that the current "types" were artificially made up, just to treat RRMS as a separate disease. In this way the number of patients was low enough to enter the orphan drugs act, and get the interferon approved by the FDA under this schema. Recent reviews state that all types are a mixture of inflammation and neurodegeneration, and that all types should be considered the same disease.

Other possible clinical courses are:

=== Preclinical MS: CIS and CDMS ===
The first manifestation of MS is the so-called Clinically isolated syndrome, or CIS, which is the first isolated attack. The current diagnosis criteria for MS do not allow doctors to give an MS diagnosis until a second attack takes place. Therefore, the concept of "clinical MS", for an MS that can be diagnosed, has been developed. Until MS diagnosis has been established, nobody can tell whether the disease one is dealing with is MS.

Cases of MS before the CIS are sometimes found during other neurological inspections and are referred to as subclinical MS. Preclinical MS refers to cases after the CIS but before the confirming second attack. After the second confirming attack the situation is referred to as CDMS (clinically defined multiple sclerosis).

CIS itself is sometimes considered itself as a disease entity, different from MS. Even if they share the same underlying condition CIS is not MS given that it lacks the presence of lesions. Approximately 84% of the subjects with CIS experience a second clinical demyelinating event and are diagnosed with clinically definite MS (CDMS) within 20 years.

=== RIS, subclinical, silent and prodromal MS ===
See also Radiologically isolated syndrome

Silent MS has been found in autopsies before the existence of MRI showing that the so-called "clinical definitions" cannot be applied to around 25% of the MS cases. Currently a distinction is made between "silent" and subclinical.

In absence of attacks, sometimes a radiological finding suggestive of demyelination (T2 hyperintensities) can be used to establish a pre-diagnosis of MS. This is often named "Radiologically Isolated Syndrome" (RIS). Cases before the first attack or CIS are subclinical in the sense that they do not produce clinical situations.

If a second radiological event appears without clinical consequences, the clinical situation is named "Silent MS" (Okuda criteria). Anyway, it is reported that all MS cases have an active subclinical phase before the CIS

It has been noted that some aspects of the MS underlying condition are present in otherwise healthy MS patients' relatives, suggesting a wider scope for the "silent MS" term.

In these cases Interleukin-8 is a risk for clinical conversion. It has also been proposed that always exists a subclinical phase in the beginning of every MS case, during which the permeability of the BBB can be used for diagnosis

It is also under investigation whether MS has a prodrome, i.e., a preliminary stage in which the disease exists with non-specific symptoms. Some reports point to a prodrome of several years for RRMS and decades for PPMS.

=== Aggressive multiple sclerosis ===
Relapsing-Remitting MS is considered aggressive when the frequency of exacerbations is not less than 3 during 2 years. Special treatment is often considered for this subtype. According to these definition aggressive MS would be a subtype of RRMS.

Other authors disagree and define aggressive MS by the accumulation of disability, considering it as a rapidly disabling disease course and therefore inside PPMS.

The aggressive course is associated to grey matter damage and meningeal inflammation, and presents a special intrathecal (meninges and CSF) inflammatory profile.

After the 2016 revision of the MS phenotypes, it is called Highly active multiple sclerosis

Mitoxantrone was approved for this special clinical course. Some reports point to Alemtuzumal being beneficial.

=== Pediatric and pubertal MS ===
MS cases are rare before puberty, but they can happen. Whether they constitute a separate disease is still an open subject. Anyway, even this pubertal MS could be more than one disease, because early-onset and late-onset have different demyelination patterns.

Pediatric MS patients tend to have active inflammatory disease course with a tendency to have brainstem / cerebellar presentations at onset. Due to efficient repair mechanisms at early life, pediatric MS patients tend to have longer time to reach EDSS 6 but reach it at earlier age.

An iron-responsive variant of MS has been reported in children.

== Controversy for the definition ==
Given that the etiology of MS is unknown, the current definitions of MS are all based on its appearance. The most commonly used definition, the McDonald criteria, requires just the presence of demyelinating lesions separated in space and time, together with the exclusion of every known demyelinating condition. However, as of 2023 most current MRI machines only pick up 60% of MS lesions, and even 7T machines only pick up 85%. The MS of MS people not discovered by MRI is found only in autopsy.

This unspecific definition has been criticized. For some people this has turned MS into a heterogeneous condition with several underlying problems. Besides, the complementary problem also exists. Given that McDonalds-MS is based just in the distribution of the lesions, even twins with the same underlying condition can be classified different

Finally, the "exclusion of every other known disease" condition also creates problems. Rightfully classified MS patients can be rightfully classified out of the spectrum when their particular underlying problem is discovered. For example, neuromyelitis optica was previously considered MS and currently is not, even if it appears that the MS definition has not changed.

Currently there is no single diagnosis test for MS that is 100% sensitive and specific.

=== Pathological and clinical definitions ===
McDonald criteria propose a clinical diagnosis based on a pathological definition, saying that the focus for diagnosis "remains on the objective demonstration of dissemination of lesions in both time and space" (DIT and DIS). But given that other diseases produce similar lesions, it is also required that those lesions cannot be explained by any other known disease.

This open definition present problems. For example, before the discovery of anti-AQP4 in 2006, most optic-spinal MS patients were classified rightfully as MS. Currently they are classified as NMO. Both diagnosis are correct even though the definition has not (apparently) changed.

According to some pathologists, a pathological definition is required because clinical definitions have problems with differential diagnosis and they always use a pathological definition on articles about post-mortem retrospective diagnosis, but for practitioners that need a diagnosis as soon as possible MS is often regarded as a pure clinical entity, defined simply by a positive result in the standard clinical case definition being then named "clinically definite MS" (CDMS, Poser) or simply "MS" (McDonald).

Both definitions lead to different results. For example, confluent subpial cortical lesions are the most specific finding for MS, being exclusively present in MS patients. but can only be detected post-mortem by an autopsy Therefore, any other diagnosis method will have false positives.

=== Other meanings of MS ===
There is no known etiology for MS and therefore no etiology-based definition is possible. Comparison to a post-mortem retrospective diagnosis is possible, but useless to practitioners and short-term researchers, and it is not usually done. Therefore, all meanings for the words "Multiple Sclerosis" are somehow diffuse.

The pathological definition based on proven dissemination in time and space has problems. For example, it leaves situations like RIS (radiologically isolated syndrome) outside the MS spectrum because the lack of proof, even in the case that this condition later could shown the same pathogenic conditions than MS cases.

Besides, usually the term "multiple sclerosis" is used to refer to the presence of the unknown underlying condition that produces the MS lesions instead to the mere presence of the lesions. The term MS is also used to refers to the process of developing the lesions.

Some authors instead speak about the biological disease vs. its clinical presentation.

Anyway, the precise meaning in each case can be normally deduced from the context.

=== Handling several clinical definitions ===
Given that several definitions of MS coexist, some authors are referring to them using whether CDMS for Poser positives, or McDonalds-MS with a prefix for McDonalds positives, including the release year in the prefix.

=== CIS and conversion to MS ===
The 2010 revision of the McDonald criteria allows the diagnosis of MS with only one proved lesion (CIS). Consistently, the later revision for the MS phenotypes in 2013 was forced to consider CIS as one of the MS phenotypes.

Therefore, the former concept of "Conversion from CIS to MS", that was declared when a patient had a second MS attack, does not apply anymore. More accurate is now to speak about conversions from the CIS phenotype to other MS phenotype.

== See also ==
- Demyelinating disease
- Pathophysiology of multiple sclerosis
- The Myelin Project
