= Tumefactive multiple sclerosis =

Atypical multiple sclerosis lesions

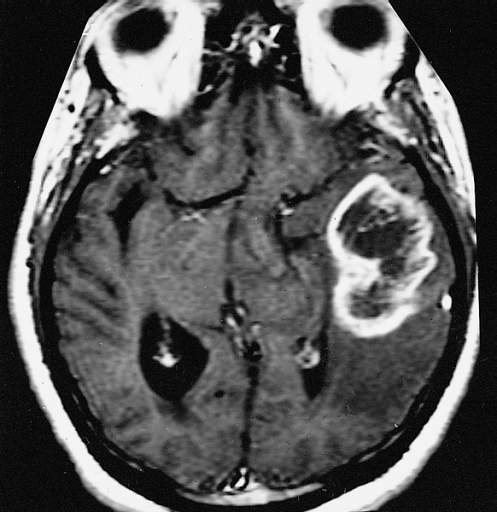
- An example of a ring-enhancement around a lesion in gliobastoma. In tumefactive multiple sclerosis, the ring-enhancement is open, not forming a complete ring.

Tumefactive multiple sclerosis is a condition in which the central nervous system of a person has multiple demyelinating lesions with atypical characteristics for those of standard multiple sclerosis (MS). It is called tumefactive as the lesions are "tumor-like" and they mimic tumors clinically, radiologically and sometimes pathologically.

These atypical lesion characteristics include a large intracranial lesion of size greater than 2.0 cm with a mass effect, edema and an open ring enhancement. A mass effect is the effect of a mass on its surroundings, for example, exerting pressure on the surrounding brain matter. Edema is the build-up of fluid within the brain tissue. Usually, the ring enhancement is directed toward the cortical surface. The tumefactive lesion may mimic a malignant glioma or cerebral abscess causing complications during the diagnosis of tumefactive MS. T2-hypointense rim and incomplete ring enhancement of the lesions on post-gadolinium T1- weighted imaging on brain MRI enable accurate diagnosis of TDL.

Normally a tumefactive demyelinating lesion appears together with smaller disseminated lesions separated in time and space, yielding a diagnosis of Multiple Sclerosis. Hence the name "tumefactive multiple sclerosis". When the demyelinating lesion appears alone it has been termed solitary sclerosis. These cases belong to a multiple sclerosis borderline and there is currently no universal agreement on how they should be considered.

Tumefactive multiple sclerosis is a demyelinating and inflammatory disease. Myelination of the axons are highly important for signalling as this improves the speed of conduction of action potentials from one axon to the next. This is done through the formation of high-resistance, low-conductance myelin sheaths around the axons by specific cells called oligodendrocytes. As such, the demyelination process affects the communication between neurons and this consequently affects the neural pathways they control. Depending on where the demyelination takes place and its severity, patients with tumefactive MS have different clinical symptoms.

== Signs and symptoms ==
Symptoms of standard MS consist of both sensory and motor symptoms. The more common symptoms include spasticity, visual loss, difficulty in walking and paresthesia which is a feeling of tickling or numbness of the skin. but symptoms of tumefactive MS are not so clear. They often mimic a variety of other diseases including ischemic stroke, peroneal nerve palsy and intracranial neurologic disease.

Subjects have been reported to suffer from a decreased motor control resulting in a 'foot drop', or significantly reduced leg movement. In other cases closer mimicking strokes, subjects may suffer from confusion, dizziness, and weakness in one side of the face. Symptoms also can mimic a neoplasm with symptoms such as headaches, aphasia, and/ or seizures.[13]

There are some differences with normal MS symptoms.

Spasticity is not as prevalent in tumefactive cases, because in standard MS it is caused by demyelination or inflammation in the motor areas of the brain or the spinal cord. This upper motor neuron syndrome appears when motor control of skeletal muscles is affected due to damage to the efferent motor pathways. Spasticity is an involuntary muscle movement like an exaggerated stretch reflex, which is when a muscle overcompensates and contracts too much in response to the muscle being stretched. It is believed that spasticity is the result of the lack of inhibitory control on the muscles, an effect of neuronal damage.

Visual loss or disturbances are also different. In standard MS, they are a result of inflammation of the optic nerve, known as optic neuritis. The effects of optic neuritis can be loss of color perception and worsening vision. Vision loss usually starts off centrally in one eye and may lead to complete loss of vision after a period of time.

The possible cognitive dysfunction is also rare in tumefactive cases. MS patients may show signs of cognitive impairment where there is a reduction in the speed of information processing, a weaker short-term memory and a difficulty in learning new concepts. This cognitive impairment is associated with the loss of brain tissue, known as brain atrophy which is a result of the demyelination process in MS.

About fatigue: most MS patients experience fatigue and this could be a direct result of the disease, depression or sleep disturbances due to MS. It is not clearly understood how MS results in physical fatigue but it is known that the repetitive usage of the same neural pathways results in nerve fiber fatigue that could cause neurological symptoms. Such repeated usage of neural pathways include continuous reading which may result in temporary vision failure.

=== Evolution ===
Some reports indicate that an initial tumefactive lesion can evolve to various pathological entities: multiple sclerosis (the most common), Balo's concentric sclerosis, Schilder's disease and acute disseminated encephalomyelitis

=== Course ===
Usually tumefactive demyelination is monophasic, but cases with recurrence have been reported

== Cause ==
The pathology of the tumefactive demyelinating lesion (TDL) is heterogeneous. Several conditions can produce tumefactive lesions. This is known because in some special cases the etiology can be identified. For example, there are some cases of NMO, misidentified as MS and treated with interferon-beta by mistake. Some of these patients developed tumefactive lesions. Anyway, it is important to have into account that NMO itself can also produce them

Some other cases have been found related to viral infection, some others related to NMOSD, others could be paraneoplastic, Also some cases could be related to hormonal treatments

Other possible cause are immunomodulatory combinations. In particular, it has been found that switching from standard MS therapies to fingolimod can trigger tumefactive lesions in some MS patients While standard multiple sclerosis process has an autoimmune response after the breach of the blood–brain barrier, in tumefactive MS things do not process in the same way, and demyelinating lesions do not always show antibody damage. Subjects with tumefactive multiple sclerosis display elevated levels of choline (Cho)/creatine ratio and increased lactate which is associated with demyelinating diseases. Cases also display oligoclonal bands in the cerebrospinal fluid.

The disease is heterogeneous and the lesions do not always comply with the requirements for multiple sclerosis diagnosis (dissemination in time and space). In these cases it is only possible to speak about tumefactive demyelination (TD).

In general, it is accepted that the two main causes of pseudo-tumoral lesions are Marburg multiple sclerosis and acute disseminated encephalomyelitis (ADEM). Tumefactive demyelination of the spinal cord is rare but it has been reported

Damage is not confined to the demyelinating area. Wallerian degeneration outside the lesions has been reported.

In general, during the acute phase, the plaques of lesions were characterized by massive demyelination with relatively axonal preservation associated with reactive astrocytosis and infiltration of macrophages. In plaques of chronic lesions, demyelinated lesions with relative axonal preservation and sharply defined margins were major findings. And myelin-laden macrophages accumulate at the edges of plaques and stay inactive

== Diagnosis ==
Diagnosis of tumefactive MS is commonly carried out using magnetic resonance imaging (MRI) and proton MR spectroscopy (H-MRS). Diagnosis is difficult as tumefactive MS may mimic the clinical and MRI characteristics of a glioma or a cerebral abscess. However, as compared to tumors and abscesses, tumefactive lesions have an open-ring enhancement as opposed to a complete ring enhancement. Even with this information, multiple imaging technologies have to be used together with biochemical tests for accurate diagnosis of tumefactive MS.

Tumefactive demyelination is distinguished from tumor by the presence of multiple lesions, absence of cortical involvement, and decrease in lesion size or detection of new lesions on serial imaging Tumefactive lesions can appear in the spinal cord, making the diagnosis even more difficult.

=== Magnetic resonance imaging ===
MRI diagnosis is based on lesions that are disseminated in time and space, meaning that there are multiple episodes and consisting of more than one area. There are two kinds of MRI used in the diagnosis of tumefactive MS, T1-weighted imaging and T2-weighted imaging. Using T1-weighted imaging, the lesions are displayed with low signal intensity, meaning that the lesions appear darker than the rest of the brain. Using T2-weighted imaging, the lesions appear with high signal intensity, meaning that the lesions appear white and brighter than the rest of the brain. When T1-weighted imaging is contrast-enhanced through the addition of gadolinium, the open ring enhancement can be viewed as a white ring around the lesion. A more specific MRI, Fluid attenuation inversion recovery (FLAIR) MRI show the signal intensity of the brain. Subjects with tumefactive multiple sclerosis may see a reduction of diffusion of the white matter in the affected area of the brain.

=== Proton MR spectroscopy ===
Proton (H+) MR spectroscopy (H-MRS) identifies biochemical changes in the brain such as the quantity of metabolic products of neural tissue including choline, creatine, N-acetylaspartate (NAA), mobile lipids and lactic acid.

When demyelination is occurring, there is breakdown of cell membranes resulting in an increase in the level of choline. NAA is specific to neurons and thus, a reduction in NAA concentration indicates neuronal or axonal dysfunction. As such, the levels of choline and NAA can be measured to determine if there is demyelination activity and inflammation in the brain.

Usually, the ratio of choline to NAA is used as biomarker being higher in gliomas than in TDLs or MS lesions

== Treatment ==
Typical tumefactive lesions have been found to be responsive to corticosteroids because of their immunosuppressive and anti-inflammatory properties. They restore the blood–brain barrier and induce cell death of T-cells.

No standard treatment exists, but practitioners seem to apply intravenous corticosteroids, followed by plasmapheresis and cyclophosphamide in non-responsive cases

Plasmapheresis has been reported to work even in the absence of response to corticosteroids

=== Disease-modifying agents ===
Pharmacologic treatments for MS include immunomodulators and immunosuppressants which reduce the frequency and severity of relapses by about 35% and reduce the lesion growth. Unfortunately they are mainly tested for RRMS and its effect in tumefactive lesions is unknown. The main ones are Interferon beta (IFN-beta), Glatiramer acetate and Mitoxantrone

Plasma exchange has been reported to work at least in some cases

=== Treatment of symptoms ===
Due to the wide range of symptoms experienced by people with MS, the treatment for each MS patient varies depending on the extent of the symptoms.

==== Spasticity ====
The treatment of spasticity ranges from physical activity to medication. Physical activity includes stretching, aerobic exercises and relaxation techniques. Currently, there is little understanding as to why these physical activities aid in relieving spasticity. Medical treatments include baclofen, diazepam and dantrolene which is a muscle-relaxant. Dantrolene has many side effects and as such, it is usually not the first choice in treatment of spasticity. The side effects include dizziness, nausea and weakness.

==== Fatigue ====
Fatigue is a common symptom and affects the daily life of individuals with MS. Changes in lifestyle are usually recommended to reduce fatigue. These include taking frequent naps and implementing exercise. MS patients who smoke are also advised to stop. Pharmacological treatment include anti-depressants and caffeine. Aspirin has also been experimented with and from clinical trial data, MS patients preferred using aspirin as compared to the placebo in the test. One hypothesis is that aspirin has an effect on the hypothalamus and can affect the perception of fatigue through altering the release of neurotransmitters and the autonomic responses.

==== Cognitive dysfunction ====
There are no approved drugs for the treatment of cognitive dysfunction, however, some treatments have shown an association with improvements in cognitive function. One such treatment is Ginkgo biloba, is a herb commonly used by patients with Alzheimer's disease.

== Epidemiology ==
Approximately 2 million people in the world suffer from multiple sclerosis Tumefactive multiple sclerosis cases make up 1 to 2 of every 1000 multiple sclerosis cases. This means that only around 2000 people in the world suffer of tumefactive MS. Of those cases, there is a higher percentage of females affected than males. The median age of onset is 37 years.

As in general MS, there are differences for gender, ethnicity and geographic location. Based on epidemiological studies, there are about 3 times more female MS patients than male patients, indicating a possibility of an increased risk due to hormones. Among different ethnic groups, MS is the most common among Caucasians and seems to have a greater incidence at latitudes above 40° as compared to at the equator. While these associations have been made, it is still unclear how they result in an increased risk of MS onset.

== Solitary sclerosis ==
Normally a tumefactive demyelinating lesion appears together with smaller disseminated lesions. Hence the name "tumefactive multiple sclerosis". When the demyelinating lesion appears alone it has been termed "solitary sclerosis"

This variant was first proposed (2012) by Mayo Clinic researches. though it was also reported by other groups more or less at the same time. It is defined as isolated demyelinating lesions which produce a progressive myelopathy similar to primary progressive MS, and is currently considered inside the tumefactive Multiple sclerosis. Some groups have reported some kind of response of this variant to biotin

=== solitary pontine lesion ===
Syndrome consisting in solitary lesions uniformly located along the trigeminal pontine pathway, producing trigeminal neuralgia (TN). They present similar clinical features than MS-TN but with a single pontine lesion.

== MOG antibody‐associated demyelinating pseudotumor ==
Some anti-MOG cases satisfy the MS requirements (lesions disseminated in time and space) and are therefore traditionally considered MS cases. After the discovery of the anti-MOG disease this classification is into revision.

== See also ==
- Idiopathic inflammatory demyelinating diseases
- Malignant multiple sclerosis
- Marburg acute multiple sclerosis
