= Aggressive multiple sclerosis =

Significant disability caused by MS

Aggressive multiple sclerosis is used to describe individuals with MS who reach significant level of disability in a short period of time. Previously, it was called malignant. Aggressive MS cases are not common: less than 5% of patients with MS experience this type of progression.

The National MS Society Advisory Committee on Clinical Trials of New Agents consensus defined it as: disease with a rapid progressive course, leading to significant disability in multiple neurologic systems or death in a relatively short time after disease onset. Reaching Expanded Disability Status Scale of 6.0 or higher, which is equivalent of needing unilateral support to ambulate (or worse) is generally considered this significant disability level.

Patients with severe forms of more common relapsing–remitting or progressive MS subtypes, as well as rare Marburg variant and Balo concentric sclerosis, could be considered to have malignant MS. Patients should be carefully worked up to rule out Neuromyelitis optica (Devic's disease) due to the distinctive pathophysiology and management strategies of this disease.

== Signs and symptoms ==
Some common physical symptoms may include: "weakness in extremities, difficulties with coordination and balance, spasticity, paresthesia, speech impediments, tremors, dizziness, hearing loss, vision impairments, bowel and bladder difficulties"

== Diagnosis ==
Earlier signs include a decrease in mobility over a short period of time. Malignant MS happens in patients that already have or have been diagnosed with MS. There is not a specific test to detect malignant MS; it is often confused with acute disseminated encephalomyelitis.

Malignant MS is diagnosed after clinical investigations. Doctors may access the symptoms and to rule out other disorders, a neurological exam is performed. Further diagnostics may include an analysis of the cerebrospinal fluid.

Neurological testing may also be performed, such as "a magnetic resonance imaging (MRI), diffusion-tensor magnetic resonance imaging (DT-MRI), and computerized brain tomography are used to detect central nervous system lesions, myelin loss, white matter abnormalities, and other physical changes in the brain."

== Treatment ==
Currently, there is no cure for malignant MS; however, "immunomodulatory therapy and other physical occupational therapies can help the management of symptoms and help them more easily perform everyday tasks such as handwriting, buttoning, and using eating utensils."

Some mobility aids, such as canes, walkers, and wheelchairs may also be helpful as well for patients struggling with balance and walking.

== Autologous stem cell transplantation ==
Anecdotal evidence shows that autologous stem-cell transplantation, intensive immunosuppression combined with autologous stem cell therapy, may be an effective means for treating this life-threatening condition. The process of this therapy entails plasmapheresis or immunosuppression with mitoxantrone, cyclophosphamide, cladribine or bone marrow transplantation. In one study on a 17-year-old patient, researchers tried treating the patient with high-dose chemotherapy plus anti-thymocyte globulin followed by autologous stem cell transplantation. The findings of this study were positive. After being treated with a methylprednisolone (mPDN) i.v, the patient improved significantly. When the patient began to relapse/remit, they were treated again, resulting in improvement. After this, the patient remained stable for roughly 7 months before suffering their third relapse/remit.

This therapy may be a therapy option for patients with malignant MS.

== See also ==
- Tumefactive multiple sclerosis
- Marburg acute multiple sclerosis
- Multiple sclerosis
- Autologous stem cell transplantation
