= Black hole sign (radiology) =

Radiologic sign in multiple sclerosis

In neuroimaging, black holes (or T1 black holes) are areas that appear dark (hypointense) relative to normal-appearing white matter on T1-weighted MRI and bright (hyperintense) on T2-weighted images. They are commonly seen in multiple sclerosis (MS).

Chronic, or persistent, black holes correspond to severe tissue damage from axon loss and demyelination, and are used as a marker of irreversible injury. Acute black holes are a more mixed group of lesions caused by edema, demyelination and axonal injury; many of them resolve as the swelling subsides, whereas persistent lesions remain dark. Because chronic black holes reflect destructive rather than inflammatory change, their number and volume have been studied as markers of disease progression in multiple sclerosis.
