= Marburg acute multiple sclerosis =

- Other names: Acute multiple sclerosis, Marburg type
- Main symptoms of multiple sclerosis

Marburg acute multiple sclerosis, also known as Marburg multiple sclerosis or acute fulminant multiple sclerosis, is considered one of the multiple sclerosis borderline diseases, which is a collection of diseases classified by some as MS variants and by others as different diseases. Other diseases in this group are neuromyelitis optica (NMO), Balo concentric sclerosis, and Schilder's disease. The graver course is one form of malignant multiple sclerosis, with patients reaching a significant level of disability in less than five years from their first symptoms, often in a matter of months.

Sometimes Marburg MS is considered a synonym for tumefactive MS, but not by all authors.

== Pathogenesis ==
Marburg MS has been reported to be closer to anti-MOG associated ADEM than to standard MS It has been reported to appear sometimes post-partum.

=== MOG antibody‐associated demyelinating pseudotumor ===
Some anti-MOG cases satisfy the MS requirements (lesions disseminated in time and space) and are therefore traditionally considered MS cases. After the discovery of the anti-MOG disease this classification is into revision.

== Diagnosis ==
It took its name from Otto Marburg. It can be diagnosed in vivo with an MRI scan. If Marburg disease occurs in the form of a single large lesion, it can be radiologically indistinguishable from a brain tumor or abscess. It is usually lethal, but it has been found to be responsive to mitoxantrone and alemtuzumab, and it has also been responsive to autologous stem cell transplantation. Recent evidence shows that Marburg's presents a heterogeneous response to medication, as does standard MS.

== Treatment ==
Historically, acute MS was a fatal disease, with death occurring within a year of onset, often secondary to extensive brainstem demyelination. Treatments include plasma exchange and/or high-dose glucocorticoids (e.g., 1 g/day of methylprednisolone for 3–5 days). Patients that satisfy criteria for MS will be treated with immunomodulatory therapies, often favoring high efficacy monoclonal antibodies.

== Prognosis ==
Marburg variant of MS is an acute fulminant demyelinating process which in most cases progresses inexorably to death within 1–2 years. However, there are some reports of Marburg MS reaching stability by three years.

== See also ==
- Malignant multiple sclerosis
- Tumefactive multiple sclerosis
