= Baló concentric sclerosis =

Baló's concentric sclerosis
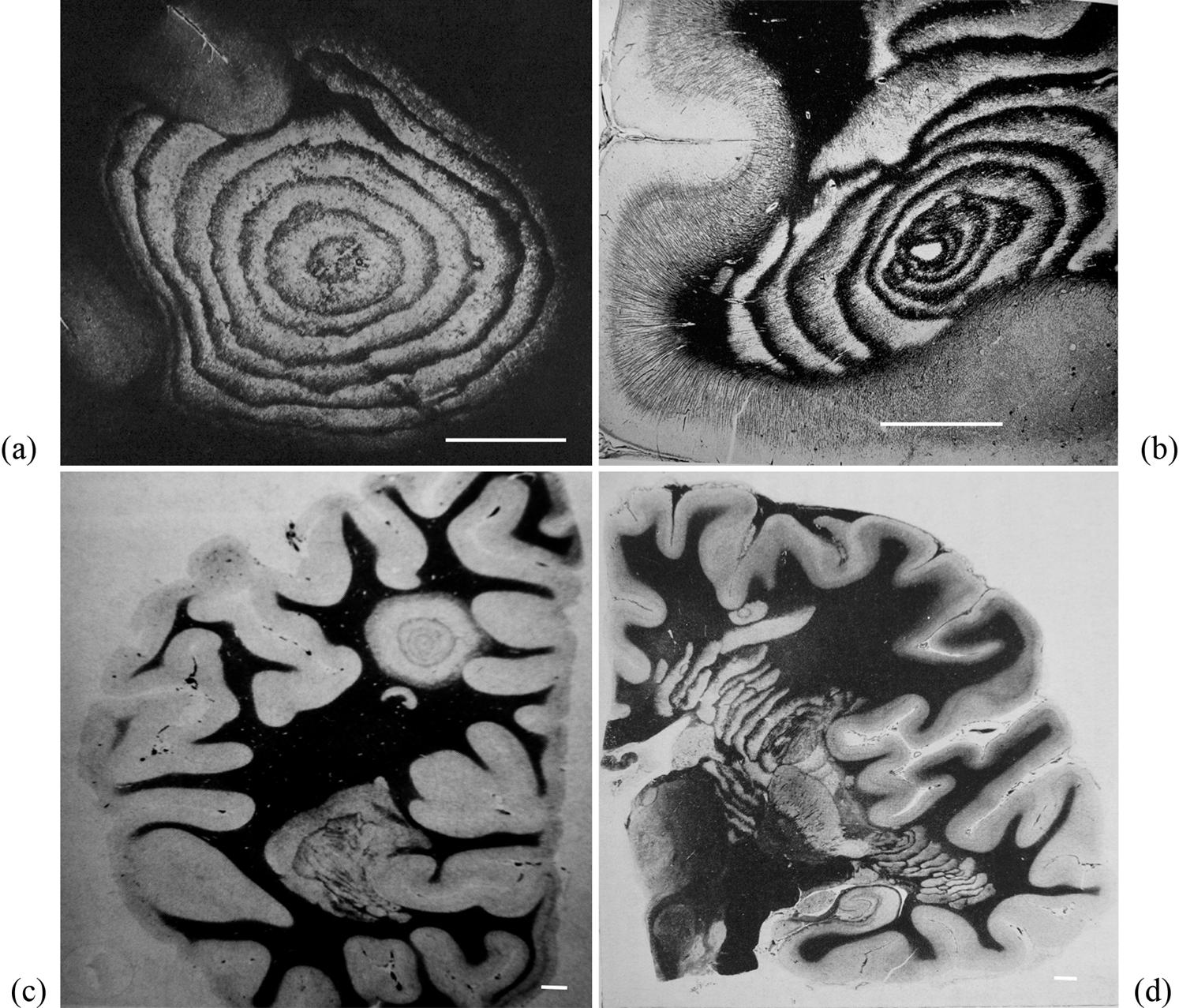
- Typical aspects of Baló's concentric sclerosis. (a, b) rings of an Onion. (c) Lesion. (d) Progress of the pathologic process from a center located in a constrained area, showing formation of bands. Loyez staining (myelin in black, destroyed areas in white); scale bars: 1 cm.
- Specialty: Neurology

Baló's concentric sclerosis is a disease in which the white matter of the brain appears damaged in concentric layers, leaving the axis cylinder intact. It was described by József Mátyás Baló who initially named it "leuko-encephalitis periaxialis concentrica" from the previous definition, and it is currently considered one of the borderline forms of multiple sclerosis.

Baló's concentric sclerosis is classified as an inflammatory demyelinating disorder of the central nervous system, distinguished from classical multiple sclerosis by the characteristic formation of concentric rings of demyelination alternating with preserved myelin. Although earlier reports suggested that the prognosis resembled that of Marburg variant multiple sclerosis, more recent case series and reviews have described patients experiencing more favorable outcomes, including asymptomatic periods, spontaneous remission, or prolonged disease stability.

Cases of Baló's concentric sclerosis have been observed to follow a range of courses, with the majority showing a single acute phase, while others demonstrate either a relapsing-remitting pattern or progression similar to aggressive forms of multiple sclerosis. Although historically considered rare, with fewer than 1% of multiple sclerosis cases showing the characteristic ring-shaped demyelination pattern, Baló's concentric sclerosis is now recognized globally, rather than being geographically confined to Asian populations as once believed.

The concentric ring appearance is not specific to Baló's concentric sclerosis. Concentric lesions have also been reported in patients with neuromyelitis optica, standard multiple sclerosis, progressive multifocal leukoencephalopathy, cerebral autosomal dominant arteriopathy with subcortical infarcts, leukoencephalopathy, concomitant active hepatitis C and human herpes virus 6.

== History ==
Although the disease is most commonly associated with the work of Hungarian pathologist József Mátyás Baló, the first descriptions of concentric demyelinating lesions were provided by Otto Marburg in 1906, who documented cases presenting with rapidly progressive neurological decline and distinctive histopathological findings.

During much of the 20th century, Baló's concentric sclerosis was considered a rare and often fatal demyelinating disease, closely linked to tumefactive variants of multiple sclerosis. The disease was characterized by rapidly progressive neurological decline and distinctive concentric demyelinating lesions, leading to its classification as a variant of multiple sclerosis. However, evolving pathological and imaging studies have since suggested that BCS represents a distinct clinicopathological entity within the broader spectrum of demyelinating diseases.

== Pathophysiology ==
The lesions of the Baló's sclerosis belong to the MS lesion pattern III (distal oligodendrogliopathy). Balo concentric sclerosis is now believed to be a variant of pattern III multiple sclerosis probably due to immune problems.

The Baló lesions show veins at their center, like those of MS, some suggestive of microhemorrhages or small ectatic venules. Unlike MS, no cortical gray matter lesions appear. Evidence from immunopathological studies suggest that, unlike other MS subtypes where demyelination is diffuse, the pathological hallmark of Baló lesions is the presence of sharply defined alternating layers of demyelinated and myelin-preserved tissue, indicative of a distinct pattern of immune-mediated attack combined with hypoxia-like stress. Histopathological investigations have observed that these lesions often contain a central vein and display organized concentric rings, supporting the view that vascular factors and microcirculatory impairment might play a role in their formation.

=== Theoretical Model ===
Mitochondrial dysfunction, particularly involving impaired complex IV activity within the respiratory chain, has also been proposed as a contributing factor to tissue damage in Baló lesions, where such deficits may exacerbate axonal injury through glutamate-mediated excitotoxic mechanisms similar to those identified in pattern III multiple sclerosis lesions. This expression and counter-expression forms rings of preserved tissue within the lesion and rings of demyelinated tissue just beyond where the previous attack had induced the protective stress proteins. Hence, subsequent attacks form concentric rings. Support for this model comes from findings of increased expression of heat shock proteins such as HSP70 and hypoxia-inducible factors (HIF-1α) in Baló lesions, which are believed to protect surrounding tissue and promote survival of axons and glial cells within the demyelinated areas. These stress responses may allow for periods of remission or tissue recovery in certain patients.

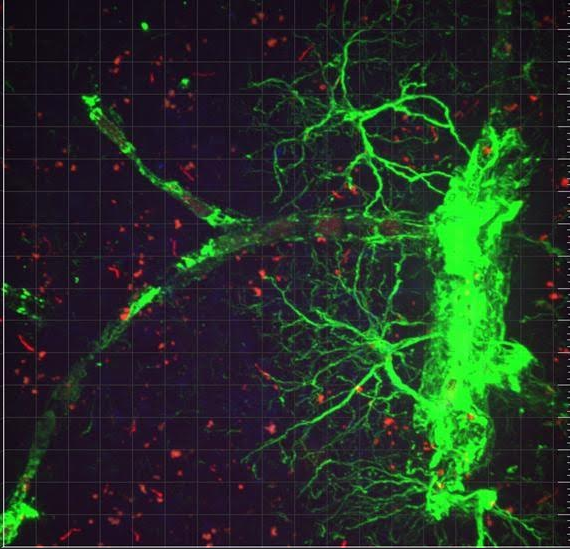
Astrocytes contribute to the central nervous system immune response by releasing pro-inflammatory and anti-inflammatory cytokines, regulating blood-brain barrier permeability, and interacting with microglia to modulate neuroinflammation. These functions support both protective and pathological processes in various neurological conditions.

In parallel to these hypoxia-related mechanisms, researchers have emphasized the potential role of mitochondrial dysfunction in lesion development. In particular, reduced activity of complex IV or the respiratory chain has been proposed to result in cellular energy deficits that amplify glutamate-mediated excitotoxic injury, a process also recognized in pattern III multiple sclerosis lesions. Studies suggest that the survival of astrocytes within lesions may also contribute to the potential for remyelination, as preserved astrocytic function and support oligodendrocyte precursor cells and restore water balance in the affected tissue. This recovery capacity has been highlighted in case reports of Baló disease patients showing substantial neurological improvement over time without aggressive immunotherapy.

This model is questioned by recent reports that found astrocyte damage, similar to the one found in aquaporin-seropositive neuromyelitis optica. Though no anti-NMO antibodies have been found, the damage is similar, pointing to problems in the water channel of the astrocytes. Recent observations of aquaporin-4 and aquaporin-1 depletion within Baló lesions even in the absence of detectable antibodies, suggests astrocytic injury plays a more role in the pathogenesis than previously thought.

=== Other Models ===
A mathematical model for concentric sclerosis has been proposed. Authors review the previous pathogenic theories, discuss the link between concentric sclerosis and Liesegang's periodic precipitation phenomenon and propose a new mechanism based on self-organization. This model proposes that the layered pattern of Baló lesions may emerge from physicochemical self-organization processes within the damaged brain tissue, similar to Liesegang ring formation in chemistry, where periodic precipitation patterns result from reaction-diffusion mechanisms.

== Clinical courses ==
More recent observations of Baló's concentric sclerosis describe a wider spectrum of clinical presentations, including relapsing-remitting and monophasic forms. While the disease can progress aggressively, several case reports have documented patients with prolonged stability or spontaneous remission, even in the absence of disease-modifying therapy. High-dose corticosteroid therapy such as intravenous methylprednisolone, is often used during acute episodes, but its efficacy in altering the long-term course of Baló's concentric sclerosis remains unclear due to a lack of controlled trials and the confounding occurrence of spontaneous improvement. The variable response to corticosteroids further highlights the unpredictable nature of Baló's concentric sclerosis.

Baló lesions can undergo radiological resolution over time, particularly in monophasic cases, yet some patients experience evolution to relapsing-remitting multiple sclerosis (RRMS), underscoring the potential for disease progression despite initial remission. Based on clinical observations, Baló's concentric sclerosis has been categorized into three phenotypic patterns: monophasic, relapsing-remitting, and primary progressive forms.

Cerebrospinal fluid (CSF) studies in Baló's concentric sclerosis typically show normal findings or mild mononuclear pleocytosis. Unlike classical Multiple sclerosis, CSF-restricted oligoclonal bands are identified only in a minority of cases, emphasizing the immunological differences between Baló's concentric sclerosis and multiple sclerosis.

The presence or absence of oligoclonal bands, as well as the clinical subtype at presentation does not consistently predict disease outcome, as some monophasic cases may remit spontaneously while others progress despite treatment. The behavior of Baló lesions is also influenced by the disease context in which they occur. These lesions have been reported in patients with aquaporin-4 seropositive and seronegative neuromyelitis optical spectrum disorder (NMOSD), where they may coexist with optic neuritis or longitudinally extensive transverse myelitis.

== Diagnosis ==
Baló's concentric sclerosis is primarily diagnosed through characteristic findings on magnetic resonance imaging (MRI), supported by cerebrospinal fluid (CSF) analysis and, in some cases, histopathological evaluation. The hallmark radiological feature is the appearance of concentric layers of demyelinated and preserved white matter, producing alternating hyperintense and hypointense bands on T2-weighted and FLAIR sequences. These lesions are typically large and tumefactive, often located in the cerebral hemispheric white matter, particularly the frontal and parietal lobes, but can also involve the corpus callosum, brainstem, or spinal cord.

Use of high-field 7-Tesla MRI has further refined lesion visualization, often revealing a central vein within Baló lesions, which supports the view of a perivenular pathogenesis similar to classical MS. Magnetic resonance spectroscopy (MRS) has demonstrated increased lactate and decreased N-acetylaspartate within Baló lesions, indicating active inflammation and neuronal loss, while diffusion tensor imaging (DTI) shows decreased fractional anisotropy, reflecting white matter damage. These imaging markers are highly consistent with histopathological features, enabling radiological-histopathological correlation and reducing the need for invasive biopsy in most cases.

CSF analysis in Baló's concentric sclerosis typically shows either normal findings or mild mononuclear pleocytosis, but differs from classical multiple sclerosis in that CSF-restricted oligoclonal bands are present only in a minority of cases. Pattern III lesions, including Baló's concentric sclerosis, also tend to test negative for the MRZ reaction, which detects intrathecal responses to measles, rubella, and varicella zoster virus, further distinguishing them from standard multiple sclerosis.

In pediatric populations, Baló's concentric sclerosis has been observed to have a more variable clinical course, with some children exhibiting favorable outcomes and lesion resolution on imaging, while other experience severe presentations similar to adult forms. Baló lesions have been identified in children presenting with acute disseminated encephalomyelitis (ADEM)-like features, reflecting the overlap of concentric lesion morphology across multiple demyelinating syndromes.

== Treatment ==
Acute Management

High dose intravenous corticosteroids, such as methylprednisolone, are commonly administered as first-line therapy for acute Baló's concentric sclerosis episodes to reduce inflammation and stabilize the blood-brain barrier. However, responses to corticosteroids can be variable, with some patients exhibiting limited improvement.

Immunosuppressive and Disease-Modifying Therapies

Given the overlap of Baló's concentric sclerosis with other demyelinating disorders, various immunosuppressive agents have been explored:

Therapy	Mechanism of Action	Uses in Baló's concentric sclerosis
Cyclophosphamide	Alkylating agent that suppresses the immune system	Used in aggressive or refractory cases; sometimes combined with other therapies
Rituximab	Monoclonal antibody targeting CD20-positive B cells	Shown efficacy in Baló patients with suspected antibody-mediated pathology
Alemtuzumab	Monoclonal antibody targeting CD52, depleting lymphocytes	Reported in individual case studies, though outcomes are variable
Ocrelizumab	Monoclonal antibody targeting CD20-positive B cells	Demonstrated effectiveness in reducing lesion size and improving neurological outcomes

Methylprednisolone (C_{22}H_{30}O_{5}), a synthetic corticosteroid, is commonly used as a first-line treatment for acute episodes of Baló's concentric sclerosis due to its anti-inflammatory and immunosuppressive properties.

Cyclophosphamide is an alkylating agent that suppresses the immune system, and has been used in aggressive or refractory cases of Baló's concentric sclerosis, sometimes in combination with other therapies. Rituximab is a monoclonal antibody targeting CD20-positive B cells (B cell markers) and has shown to benefit patients with features suggestive of antibody-mediated pathology. Another monoclonal antibody called alemtuzumab targets CD52 and depletes a broad range of immune cells. The use of alemtuzumab in Baló's concentric sclerosis has been reported in a case study indicating potential benefits, although some outcomes can vary. Ocrelizumab is similar to rituximab in that it targets CD20-positive B cells and has demonstrated effectiveness in reducing lesion size and improving neurological function in cases of Baló's concentric sclerosis.

Supportive Care and Monitoring

Regular monitoring through MRI is essential to assess lesion progression or resolution. Given the potential for spontaneous remission in some cases, treatment plans should be individualized, balancing the risks and benefits of aggressive immunosuppression. Multidisciplinary care, including physical and occupational therapy, may aid in functional recovery and improve quality of life.

== Epidemiology ==
Baló's concentric sclerosis most commonly affects individuals between 20–40 years of age, although pediatric and elderly cases have been documented. While multiple sclerosis is generally more prevalent in females, Baló's concentric sclerosis seems to show a slight male predominance, distinguishing from typical multiple sclerosis epidemiological patterns. In addition to its occurrence as an isolated demyelinating syndrome, Baló's lesions have also been reported in association with tumefactive inflammatory leukoencephalopathy, where they may present as part of a larger tumefactive plaques.

Potential associations between Baló's concentric sclerosis and systemic autoimmune diseases, including psoriasis and autoimmune thyroiditis, have also been reported, although the significance of these findings remain unclear and warrants further investigation.

Pattern III (Baló-like) Demyelinating Spectrum

Baló-like lesions were classified as MS lesion pattern III in the MS spectrum. They have been reported alone, but also associated to standard multiple sclerosis, neuromyelitis optica, CADASIL and progressive multifocal leukoencephalopathy. There is an overlap between what is considered Baló concentric sclerosis and some atypical cases of multiple sclerosis. A special subtype of multiple sclerosis presents Baló-like lesions (pattern III lesions) creating an intersection between these two conditions.

Some patients with Baló concentric sclerosis present oligoclonal bands while others do not. It has been proposed that Baló concentric sclerosis lesions may not denote a single disease, but a final pathway of various demyelinating diseases, reflecting the presence of intralesional hypoxia as recently proposed. Recently it has been reported that pattern III lesions are responsive to mitoxantrone. On the other hand, this pattern is the less responsive to plasmapheresis. Pattern III lesions can be diagnosed without a biopsy because these patients show a high reactivity to AQP1 (without antibody) and varicella zoster virus (VZV).

=== Etiology of Lesions ===
The pathogenesis of Baló concentric sclerosis and pattern III multiple sclerosis lesions has been a subject of ongoing debate. Early hypotheses proposed that pattern III lesions represented an initial stage in the development of classical multiple sclerosis plaques; however, subsequent pathological and immunological studies have cast doubt on this view, suggesting that these lesions may instead reflect a distinct pathogenic process. Pattern III lesions are characterized by features of distal oligodendrogliopathy and selective oligodendrocyte apoptosis, which differ from the more common pattern I and pattern II multiple sclerosis lesions, where perivascular T-cell infiltration and antibody and complement deposition dominate. This distinct pathology has led to consideration of alternative environmental or infectious triggers as contributing factors to the development of these lesions. One such proposed trigger involves the bacterium Clostridium perfringens. A study by Rumah et al. (2013) identified type B strains of C. perfringens, known for producing the epsilon toxin, in a patient at the first clinical presentation of multiple sclerosis, suggesting a potential environmental association with lesion initiation. This hypothesis is supported by findings showing that individuals with multiple sclerosis exhibit significantly higher immune reactivity against epsilon toxin compared to healthy controls, indicating prior exposure or immune sensitization to this microbial product.

Further complicating the etiological understanding of Baló concentric sclerosis is evidence of astrocytic involvement with lesion formation. Studies have demonstrated loss of both auqaporin-1 (AQP1) and aquaporin-4 (AQP4) channels in demyelinated regions of Baló concentric sclerosis patients, even in the absence of detectable AQP4 autoantibodies. This pattern of astrocyte damage differs from that seen in classical neuromyelitis optica spectrum disorder (NMOSD), where AQP4-IgG antibodies are typically present, yet suggests a possible overlap in the astrocytopathic mechanisms contributing to lesion development. Patients have also shown heightened immune reactivity to AQP1 peptides, implying that astrocytic injury may be mediated by mechanisms other than antibody binding, possibly involving direct T-cell cytotoxicity or toxin-mediated astrocytic dysfunction.

== See also ==
- Multiple sclerosis
- The Lesion Project
- Tumefactive multiple sclerosis
