= Otto Marburg =

Austrian neurologist (1874–1948)

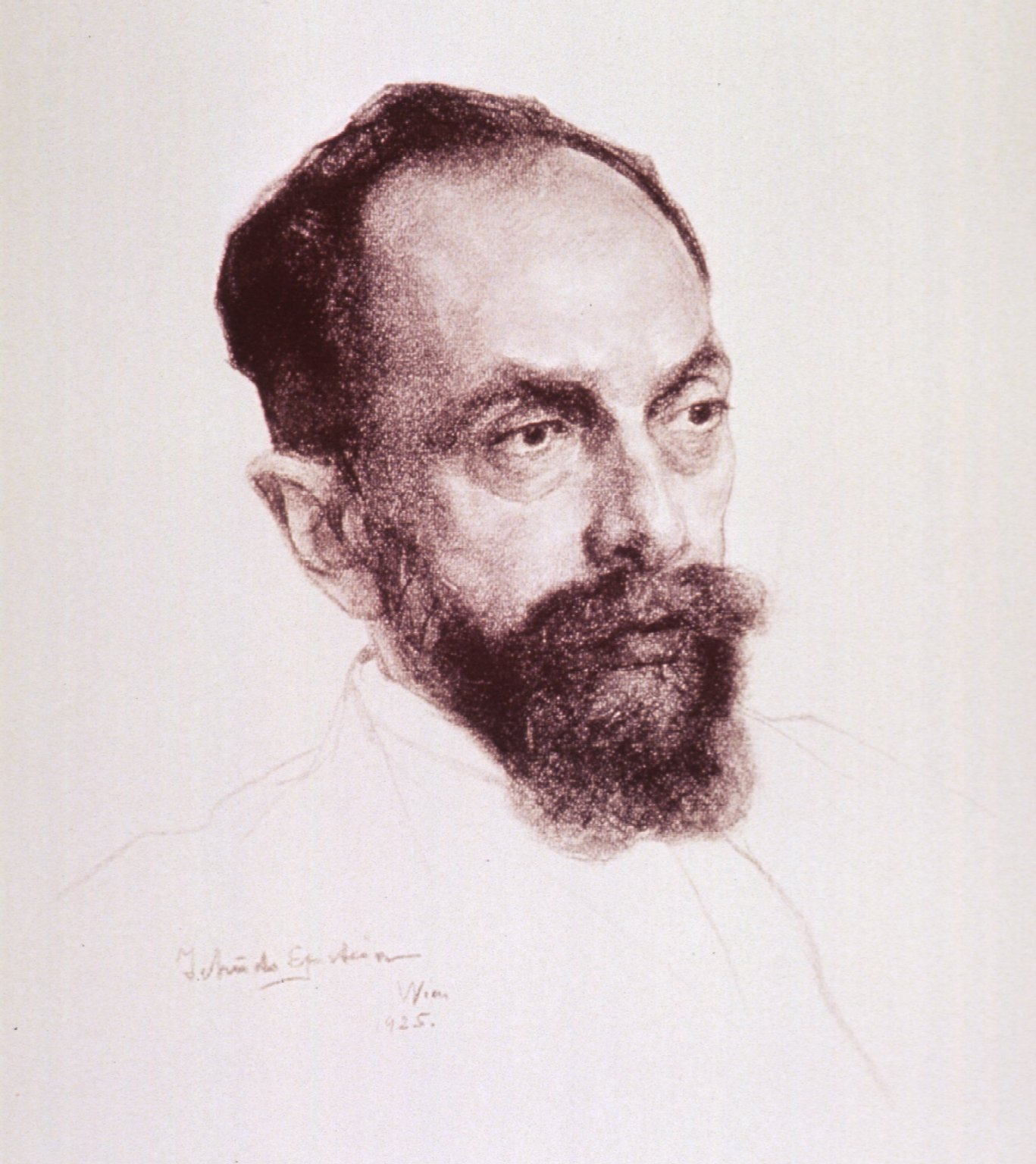
- Otto Marburg in 1927
- Born: May 25, 1874; Römerstadt, Moravia, Austria-Hungary
- Died: June 13, 1948 (aged 74); New York, New York, United States
- Occupation: Neurologist

Otto Marburg (May 25, 1874 – June 13, 1948) was an Austrian neurologist known for his contributions to the understanding of multiple sclerosis and for advances in neurooncology.

Marburg was born in Römerstadt in Moravia, Austria-Hungary (today Rýmařov, Czech Republic). He was Jewish. From 1919 to 1938, he was head of the Neurological Institute at the University of Vienna. Following the 1938 Anschluss, Marburg was forced to emigrate to the United States as a refugee. His mother died of dysentery in Theresienstadt concentration camp at the age of 92. Arriving in New York City, he joined Columbia University's College of Physicians and Surgeons as a clinical professor of neurology.

He was the author of several standard texts about the nervous system, and a subtype of multiple sclerosis (Marburg multiple sclerosis) has been named after him.

Marburg died of cancer in New York in 1948, at the age of 74.

Otto Marburg was not associated with the Marburg virus, which was discovered in 1967 in the German town of Marburg.

== Publications ==
- O. Marburg: Mikroskopisch-topographischer Atlas des menschlichen Zentralnervensystems mit begleitendem Texte. third edition Franz Deuticke, Leipzig, Vienna 1927. (first edition- 1904, second edition- 1927) - Microscopic-topographical atlas of the human central nervous system with accompanying text.
- O. Marburg: Die physikalischen Heilmethoden in Einzeldarstellungen für praktische Ärzte und Studierende. Franz Deuticke, Leipzig, Vienna 1905.
- O. Marburg: Die Hemiatrophia facialis progressiva; der umschriebene Gesichtsschwund. Hölder, Vienna 1912 - Progressive facial hemiatrophy.
- J. A. Hirschl, O. Marburg: Syphilis des Nervensystems, einschliesslich Tabes und Paralyse. Hölder, Vienna 1914 - Syphilis of the nervous system, including tabes and paralysis.
- G. Alexander, O. Marburg, H. Brunner (editors): Handbuch der Neurologie des Ohres. four volumes, Urban & Schwarzenberg, Berlin 1923–1929 - Handbook of neurology of the ear.
- O. Marburg: Der Kopfschmerz und seine Behandlung. Moritz Perles, Vienna 1926 - Headache and its treatment.
- O. Marburg: Der Schlaf, seine Störungen und deren Behandlung. Springer, Berlin, Vienna 1928 - Sleep disorders and treatment.
- J. Meller, O. Marburg: Zur Kenntnis des Wesens der sogenannten Czermak-v. Hippelschen Netzhauterkran-kung. S. Karger, Berlin 1928 - Knowledge of the nature of the so-called "Czermak-von Hippel Netzhauterkran effect".
- O. Marburg: Unfall und Hirngeschwulst: Ein Beitrag zur Ätiologie der Hirngeschwülste. Springer, Berlin 1934 - Contribution to the etiology of brain tumors.
- E. Grünthal, F. Hiller, O. Marburg: Traumatische präsenile und senile Erkrankungen, Zirkulationsstörun-gen. Springer, Berlin 1936 - Traumatic presenile and senile diseases.
- O. Marburg, M. Helfand: Injuries of the nervous system, including poisonings. Veritas Press, New York 1939 -
- O. Marburg: Hydrocephalus: its symptomatology, pathology, pathogenesis and treatment. Oskar Piest, New York 1940.
