= Pathophysiology of multiple sclerosis =

Disease pathology and physiology

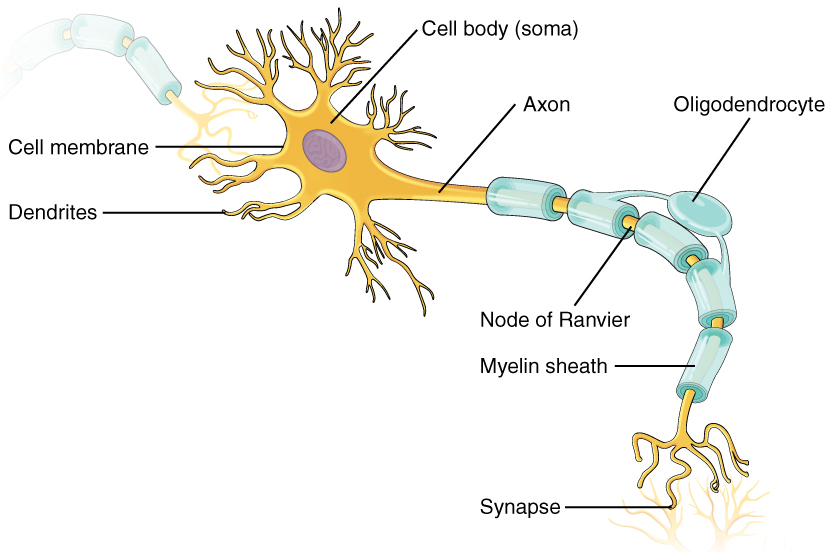
Myelin sheath of a healthy neuron in the central nervous system

Multiple sclerosis is an inflammatory demyelinating disease of the CNS in which activated immune cells invade the central nervous system and cause inflammation, neurodegeneration, and tissue damage. The underlying cause is currently unknown. Current research in neuropathology, neuroimmunology, neurobiology, and neuroimaging, together with clinical neurology, provide support for the notion that MS is not a single disease but rather a spectrum.

There are three clinical phenotypes: relapsing-remitting MS (RRMS), characterized by periods of neurological worsening following by remissions; secondary-progressive MS (SPMS), in which there is gradual progression of neurological dysfunction with fewer or no relapses; and primary-progressive MS (MS), in which neurological deterioration is observed from onset.

Pathophysiology is a convergence of pathology with physiology. Pathology is the medical discipline that describes conditions typically observed during a disease state; whereas physiology is the biological discipline that describes processes or mechanisms operating within an organism. Referring to MS, the physiology refers to the different processes that lead to the development of the lesions and the pathology refers to the condition associated with the lesions.

== Pathology ==
Myelin sheath damage in multiple sclerosis

Multiple sclerosis can be pathologically defined as the presence of distributed glial scars (or sclerosis) in the central nervous system disseminated in time (DIT) and space (DIS). The gold standard for MS diagnosis is pathological correlation, though given its limited availability, other diagnosis methods are normally used. The scleroses that define the disease are the remainders of previous demyelinating lesions in the CNS white matter of a patient (encephalomyelitis) showing special characteristics, such as confluent instead of perivenous demyelination.

There are three phases for how an unknown underlying condition may cause damage in MS:

1. An unknown soluble factor (produced by CD8+ T-cells or CD20+ B-cells), creates a toxic environment that activates microglia.
2. MRI-abnormal areas with hidden damage appear in the brain and spine (NAWM, NAGM, DAWM). Some clusters of activated microglia, axonal transection and myelin degeneration are present.
3. Leaks in the blood–brain barrier appear and immune cells infiltrate, causing demyelination. and axon destruction.

Multiple sclerosis differs from other idiopathic inflammatory demyelinating diseases in its confluent subpial cortical lesions. These types of lesions are the most specific finding for MS, being exclusively present in MS patients, though currently they can only be detected at autopsy.

Most MS findings take place inside the white matter, and lesions appear mainly in a periventricular distribution (clustered around the ventricles of the brain). Apart from white matter demyelination, the cortex and deep gray matter (GM) nuclei can be affected, together with diffuse injury of the NAWM. GM atrophy is independent of classical MS lesions and is associated with physical disability, fatigue, and cognitive impairment in MS

At least five characteristics are present in CNS tissues of MS patients: Inflammation beyond classical white matter lesions, intrathecal Ig production with oligoclonal bands, an environment fostering immune cell persistence, and a disruption of the blood–brain barrier outside of active lesions. The scars that give the name to the condition are produced by astrocytes healing old lesions. MS is active even during remission periods.

=== Meningeal tertiary lymphoid-like structures ===
Follicle-like aggregates in the meninges are formed only in secondary progressive MS. and correlate with the degree of subpial cortical demyelination and brain atrophy, suggesting that they might contribute to cortical pathology in SPMS

These ectopic lymphoid follicles are composed mainly of EBV infected B-cells.

=== Demyelination patterns ===
Four different damage patterns have been identified in patient's brain tissues. The original report suggests that there may be several types of MS with different immune causes, and that MS may be a family of several diseases. Though originally a biopsy was required to classify the lesions of a patient, since 2012 it is possible to classify them by a blood test looking for antibodies against 7 lipids, three of which are cholesterol derivatives Cholesterol crystals are believed to both impair myelin repair and aggravate inflammation.

It is believed that they may correlate with differences in disease type and prognosis, and perhaps with different responses to treatment. In any case, understanding lesion patterns can provide information about differences in disease between individuals and enable doctors to make more effective treatment decisions.

According to one of the researchers involved in the original research, "Two patterns (I and II) showed close similarities to T-cell-mediated or T-cell plus antibody-mediated autoimmune encephalomyelitis, respectively. The other patterns (III and IV) were highly suggestive of a primary oligodendrocyte dystrophy, reminiscent of virus- or toxin-induced demyelination rather than autoimmunity."

The four identified patterns are:

Pattern I
The scar presents T-cells and macrophages around blood vessels, with preservation of oligodendrocytes, but no signs of complement system activation.

Pattern II
The scar presents T-cells and macrophages around blood vessels, with preservation of oligodendrocytes, as before, but also signs of complement system activation can be found. This pattern has been considered similar to damage seen in NMO, though AQP4 damage does not appear in pattern II MS lesions Nevertheless, pattern II has been reported to respond to plasmapheresis, which points to something pathogenic into the blood serum.

The complement system infiltration in these cases convert this pattern into a candidate for research into autoimmune connections like anti-Kir4.1, anti-Anoctamin-2 or anti-MOG mediated MS About the last possibility, research has found antiMOG antibodies in some pattern-II MS patients.

Pattern II pathogenic T cells has been shown to be different from others The functional characterization shows that T cells releasing Th2 cytokines and helping B cells dominate the T-cell infiltrate in pattern II brain lesions.

Pattern III
The scars are diffuse with inflammation, distal oligodendrogliopathy, microglial activation and loss of myelin-associated glycoprotein (MAG). It is considered atypical and an overlap between MS and Balo concentric sclerosis. The scars do not surround the blood vessels, and a rim of preserved myelin appears around the vessels. There is evidence of partial remyelinization and oligodendrocyte apoptosis. At first, some researchers thought it was an early stage of the evolution of the other patterns. Recently, it is thought that it represents ischaemia-like injury with absence of oligoclonal bands in the CSF, related to the pathogenesis of Balo concentric sclerosis.

Pattern IV
The scar presents sharp borders and oligodendrocyte degeneration, with a rim of normal-appearing white matter. There is a lack of oligodendrocytes in the center of the scar. There is no complement activation or MAG loss.

These differences are noticeable only in early lesions and the heterogeneity was controversial for some time because some research groups thought that these four patterns could be a consequence of the age of the lesions. Nevertheless, after some debate among research groups, the four patterns model is accepted and the exceptional case found by Prineas has been classified as NMO

For some investigation teams this means that MS is an immunopathogenetically heterogeneous disease. The latter hypothesis is further corroborated by a recent study that demonstrated significant differences in routine cerebrospinal fluid findings between patients with pattern I lesions and patients with non-pattern I lesions, including a lack of CSF-restricted oligoclonal bands, in most pattern II and III patients. Finally, some previously diagnosed with pattern II MS were later found to have in fact MOG-IgG-related encephalomyelitis, suggesting that both the current clinicoradiological diagnostic criteria for MS and the histopathological criteria for MS may be insufficiently specific. This was already indicated by previous studies that found a relatively high rate of false diagnoses of MS among patients with AQP4-IgG-positive neuromyelitis optica spectrum disorders or MOG encephalomyelitis. Currently antibodies to lipids and peptides in sera, detected by microarrays, can be used as markers of the pathological subtype given by brain biopsy.

Another development in this area is the finding that some lesions present mitochondrial defects that could distinguish types of lesions.

== Physiology of MS ==
In multiple sclerosis, inflammation, demyelination, and neurodegeneration are observed together. Some clinical trials have shown that the inflammation produces both the relapses and the demyelination, and that neurodegeneration (axonal transection) is independent from inflammation, produces the accumulative disability, and advances even when inflammation and demyelination are delayed. It seems that neurodegeneration is produced by damaged mitochondria, which in turn comes from activated microglia.

Currently it is unknown what the primary cause of MS is; if MS is a heterogeneous disease, the lesion development process would not be unique. In particular, some PPMS patients having a special clinical course named rapidly progressive multiple sclerosis could have a special genetic cause and a different development process.

Several types of damage appear in the brain: normal appearing white matter (NAWM) and characteristic lesions. Changes in NAWM include axonal injury without demyelination, low-grade inflammation, and microglial and astrocytic activation

=== MS lesion development ===
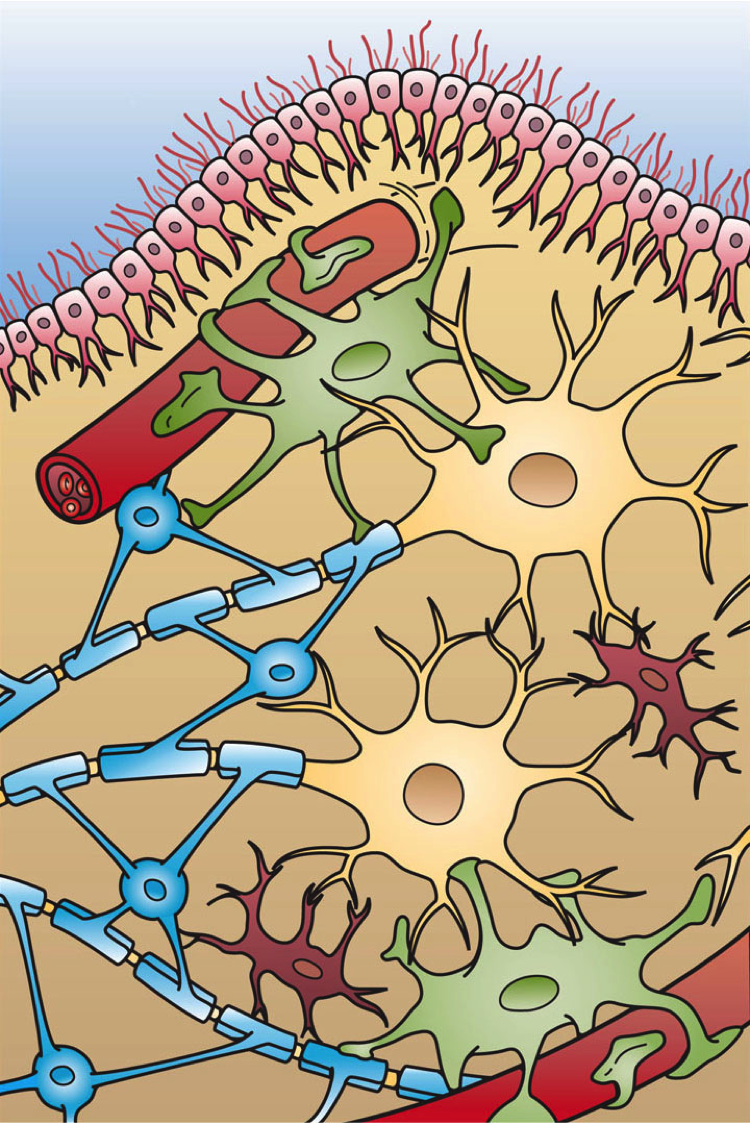
Illustration of the four different types of glial cells found in the central nervous system: ependymal cells, astrocytes, microglial cells, and oligodendrocytes

MS lesions develop inside NAWM areas. Their shape is influenced by their activity

The most accepted sequence of events is first NAWM appearance, then the so-called pre-active lesions, with activated microglia, and finally the BBB (blood-brain barrier) breakdown, which enables the entry of T-cells to the CNS. This marks the beginning of an autoimmune attack which destroys myelin in active lesions. When the attack is resolved, a characteristic glial scar is formed by astrocytes.

Current models can be divided into two categories: inside-out and outside-in. In the former, it is hypothesized that a problem in CNS cells produces an immune response that destroys myelin and subsequently breaks the BBB. In latter, an external factor produces BBB leaks, enters the CNS, and destroys myelin and axons. Whatever the underlying condition for MS is, it appears that damage is triggered by an unknown soluble factor in the CSF, potentially produced in meningeal areas; this factor can diffuse into the cortical parenchyma and destroy myelin either directly or indirectly through microglia activation.

The evolution of a preactive lesion is related to microglia reactivity. Increased expression of pro-inflammatory cell surface markers have been observed in NAWM and "initial" lesions, corresponding to a so-called loss of homeostatic microglial equilibrium.

Some authors report active lesion formation before BBB breakdown; others point to adipsin as a factor of the breakdown.

MS lesions are driven mainly by T-cells. It has been found recently that B-cells are also involved.

=== Blood–brain barrier disruption ===
The blood–brain barrier (BBB) is a protective barrier that denies the entrance of foreign material into the nervous system. BBB disruption is the moment in which penetration of the barrier by lymphocytes occur and has been considered one of the early problems in MS lesions.

The BBB is composed of endothelial cells which line the blood vessel walls of the central nervous system. Compared to normal endothelial cells, the cells lining the BBB are connected by occludin and claudin which form tight junctions in order to create a barrier to keep out larger molecules such as proteins. In order to pass through, molecules must be taken in by transport proteins or an alteration in the BBB permeability must occur, such as interactions with associated adaptor proteins like ZO-1, ZO-2 and ZO-3.

The BBB is compromised due to active recruitment of lymphocytes and monocytes and their migration across the barrier. Release of chemokines allow for the activation of adhesion molecules on the lymphocytes and monocytes, resulting in an interaction with the endothelial cells of the BBB which then activate the expression of matrix metalloproteinases to degrade the barrier. This results in disruption of the BBB, causing an increase in barrier permeability due to the degradation of tight junctions which maintain barrier integrity. Inducing the formation of tight junctions can restore BBB integrity and reduces its permeability, which can be used to reduce the damage caused by lymphocyte and monocyte migration across the barrier as restored integrity would restrict their movement.

After barrier breakdown symptoms may appear, such as swelling. Activation of macrophages and lymphocytes and their migration across the barrier may result in direct attacks on myelin sheaths within the central nervous system, leading to the characteristic demyelination event observed in MS. After demyelination has occurred, the degraded myelin sheath components, such as myelin basic proteins and Myelin oligodendrocyte glycoproteins, are then used as identifying factors to facilitate further immune activity upon myelin sheaths. Further activation of cytokines is also induced by macrophage and lymphocyte activity, promoting inflammatory activity as well continued activation of proteins such as matrix metalloproteinases, which have detrimental effect on BBB integrity.

Recently it has been found that BBB damage happens even in non-enhancing lesions. MS has an important vascular component.

=== Postmortem BBB study ===
Postmortem studies of the BBB, especially the vascular endothelium, show immunological abnormalities. Microvessels in periplaque areas coexpressed HLA-DR and VCAM-1, some others HLA-DR and urokinase plasminogen activator receptor, and others HLA-DR and ICAM-1.

=== In vivo BBB ===
The damaged white matter is known as "Normal-appearing white matter" (NAWM) and is where lesions appear. These lesions form in NAWM before blood–brain barrier breakdown.

BBB can be broken centripetally (the most normal) or centrifugally. Several possible biochemical disrupters were proposed. Some hypotheses about how the BBB is compromised revolve around the presence of compounds in the blood that could interact with vessels only in the NAWM areas. The permeability of two cytokines, Interleukin 15 and LPS, may be involved in BBB breakdown. Breakdown is responsible for monocyte infiltration and inflammation in the brain. Monocyte migration and LFA-1-mediated attachment to brain microvascular endothelia is regulated by SDF-1alpha through Lyn kinase.

Using iron nanoparticles, involvement of macrophages in BBB breakdown can be detected. A special role is played by Matrix metalloproteinases. These increase BBB T-cell permeability, specially in the case of MMP-9 and are supposedly related to the mechanism of action of interferons.

Whether BBB dysfunction is the cause or the consequence of MS is disputed, because activated T-Cells can cross a healthy BBB when they express adhesion proteins. Apart from that, activated T-Cells can cross a healthy BBB when they express adhesion proteins. (Adhesion molecules could also play a role in inflammation) In particular, one of these adhesion proteins involved is ALCAM (Activated Leukocyte Cell Adhesion Molecule, also called CD166), and is under study as therapeutic target. Another protein involved is CXCL12, which is found also in brain biopsies of inflammatory elements, and which could be related to the behavior of CXCL13 under methylprednisolone therapy. Some molecular biochemical models for relapses have been proposed.

Normally, gadolinium enhancement is used to show BBB disruption on MRIs. Abnormal tight junctions are present in both SPMS and PPMS. They appear in active white matter lesions and in gray matter in SPMS. They persist in inactive lesions, particularly in PPMS.

A uric acid deficiency was implicated in this process. Uric acid added in physiological concentrations (i.e. achieving normal concentrations) is therapeutic in MS by preventing BBB breakdown through inactivation of peroxynitrite. The low level of uric acid found in people with MS is manifestedly causative rather than a tissue damage consequence in the white matter lesions, but not in the grey matter lesions. Uric acid levels are lower during relapses.

== Proposed causes ==
It is not known what causes MS. Several problems appear together with the white matter lesions, like cortical lesions and normal-appearing tissues. Several theories have been proposed to explain it.

Some areas that appear normal under normal MRI look abnormal under special MRI, like magnetisation transfer MTR-MRI. These are called Normal Appearing White Matter (NAWM) and Normal Appearing Grey Matter (NAGM). The cause why the normal appearing areas appear in the brain is unknown, but seems clear that they appear mainly in the ventricles and that they predict the course of the disease.

Given that MS lesions begin inside the NAWM areas, these areas are expected to be produced by the same underlying condition that produces the lesions, and therefore the ultimate MS underlying condition, whatever it is. Historically, several theories about how these areas appear have been presented:

=== Autoimmune theories ===
The search for an auto-antigen has taken a long time, but at least there is one reported. It is the enzyme GDP-L-fucose synthase.

This theory in part could also explain why some patients report amelioration under dietary treatment.

=== HERVs ===
Human endogenous retroviruses (HERVs) have been reported in MS for several years. In fact, one of the families, Human Endogenous Retrovirus-W was first discovered while studying MS patients.

Recent research as of 2019 point to one of the HERV-W viruses (pHEV-W), and specifically one of the proteins of the viral capsid that has been found to activate microglia in vitro. Activated microglia in turn produces demyelination. Some interactions between the Epstein-Barr virus and the HERVs could be the trigger of the MS microglia reactions. Supporting this study, a monoclonal antibody against the viral capside (Temelimab) has shown good results in trials in phase IIb.

=== Blood flow related theories ===
- Venous pathology has been associated with MS for more than a century. Pathologist Georg Eduard Rindfleisch noted in 1863 that the inflammation-associated lesions were distributed around veins. Some other authors like Tracy Putnam pointed to venous obstructions.
- Mechanical flow: Later the focus moved to softer hemodynamic abnormalities, which were showing precede changes in sub-cortical gray matter and in substantia nigra. However, such reports of a "hemodynamic cause of MS" are not universal, and possibly not even common. At this time the evidence is largely anecdotal and some MS patients have no blood flow issues. Possibly vascular problems may be an aggravating factor, like many others in MS. Indeed, the research, by demonstrating patients with no hemodynamic problems actually prove that this is not the only cause of MS.
- Endothelium: Other theories point to a possible primary endothelial dysfunction. The importance of vascular misbehaviour in MS pathogenesis has also been independently confirmed by seven-tesla MRI. It is reported that a number of studies have provided evidence of vascular occlusion in MS, which suggest the possibility of a primary vascular injury in MS lesions or at least that they are occasionally correlated.
- Venous insufficiency: Some morphologically special medullar lesions (wedge-shaped) have also been linked to venous insufficiency.
- BBB infection: It has also been pointed out that some infectious agents with positive correlation to MS, specially Chlamydia pneumoniae, can cause problems in veins and arteries walls
- CCSVI: The term "chronic cerebrospinal venous insufficiency" was coined in 2008 by Paolo Zamboni, who described it in patients with multiple sclerosis. Instead of intracranial venous problems he described extracranial blockages, and he stated that the location of those obstructions seemed to influence the clinical course of the disease. According to Zamboni, CCSVI had a high sensitivity and specificity differentiating healthy individuals from those with multiple sclerosis. Zamboni's results were criticized as some of his studies were not blinded and they need to be verified by further studies. As of 2010 the theory is considered at least defensible
- A more detailed evidence of a correlation between the place and type of venous malformations imaged and the reported symptoms of multiple sclerosis in the same patients was published in 2010.
- Haemodynamic problems have been found in the blood flow of MS patients using Doppler, initially using transcranial color-coded duplex sonography (TCCS), pointing to a relationship with a vascular disease called chronic cerebro-spinal venous insufficiency (CCSVI). In 2010 there were conflicting results when evaluating the relationship between MS and CCSVI. but is important to note that positives have appeared among the blinded studies.
- CSF flow: Other theories focus in the possible role of cerebrospinal fluid flow impairment. This theory could be partially consistent with the previous one. Currently a small trial with 8 participants has been performed

=== CSF composition: Kir4.1 and Anoctamin-2 ===
Whatever the underlying primary condition is, it is expected to be a soluble factor in the CSF, maybe an unknown cytokine or ceramide, or a combination of them. Also B-cells and microglia could be involved. In particular, it is known that B-cells of MS patients secrete an unknown toxin against oligodendrocytes

It has been reported several times that CSF of some MS patients can damage myelin in culture and mice and ceramides have been recently brought into the stage. Whatever the problem is, it produces apoptosis of neurons respecting astrocytes

In 2012 it was reported that a subset of MS patients have a seropositive anti-Kir4.1 status, which can represent up to a 47% of the MS cases, and the study has been reproduced by at least two other groups.

In 2016 a similar association was reported for anti-Anoctamin-2

If the existence of any of these subsets of MS is confirmed, the situation would be similar to what happened for Devic Disease and Aquaporin-4. MS could be considered a heterogeneous condition or a new medical entity will be defined for these cases.

=== Primary neuro-degeneration theories ===
Some authors propose a primary neurodegenerative factor. Maybe the strongest argument supporting this theory comes from the comparison with NMO. Though autoimmune demyelination is strong, axons are preserved, showing that the standard model of a primary demyelination cannot be hold. The theory of the trans-synaptic degeneration, is compatible with other models based in the CSF biochemistry.

Others propose an oligodendrocyte stress as primary dysfunction, which activates microglia creating the NAWM areas and others propose a yet-unknown intrinsic CNS trigger induces the microglial activation and clustering, which they point out could be again axonal injury or oligodendrocyte stress.

Finally, other authors point to a cortical pathology which starts in the brain external layer (pial surface) and progresses extending into the brain inner layers

=== Genetic causes ===
If as expected MS is an heterogeneous disease and the lesion development process would not be unique. In particular, some PPMS patients have been found to have a special genetic variant named rapidly progressive multiple sclerosis which would behave differently from what here is explained.

It is due to a mutation inside the gene NR1H3, an arginine to glutamine mutation in the position p.Arg415Gln, in an area that codifies the protein LXRA.

== Biomarkers ==
Main:Multiple sclerosis biomarkers

Several biomarkers for diagnosis, disease evolution and response to medication (current or expected) are under research. While most of them are still under research, there are some of them already well stablished:

- oligoclonal bands: They present proteins that are in the CNS or in blood. Those that are in CNS but not in blood suggest a diagnosis of MS.
- MRZ-Reaction: A polyspecific antiviral immune response against the viruses of measles, rubella and zoster found in 1992. In some reports the MRZR showed a lower sensitivity than OCB (70% vs. 100%), but a higher specificity (69% vs. 92%) for MS.
- free light chains (FLC). Several authors have reported that they are comparable or even better than oligoclonal bands.

== See also ==
- Multiple sclerosis borderline
