= Demyelinating disease =

Any neurological disease in which the myelin sheath of neurons is damaged

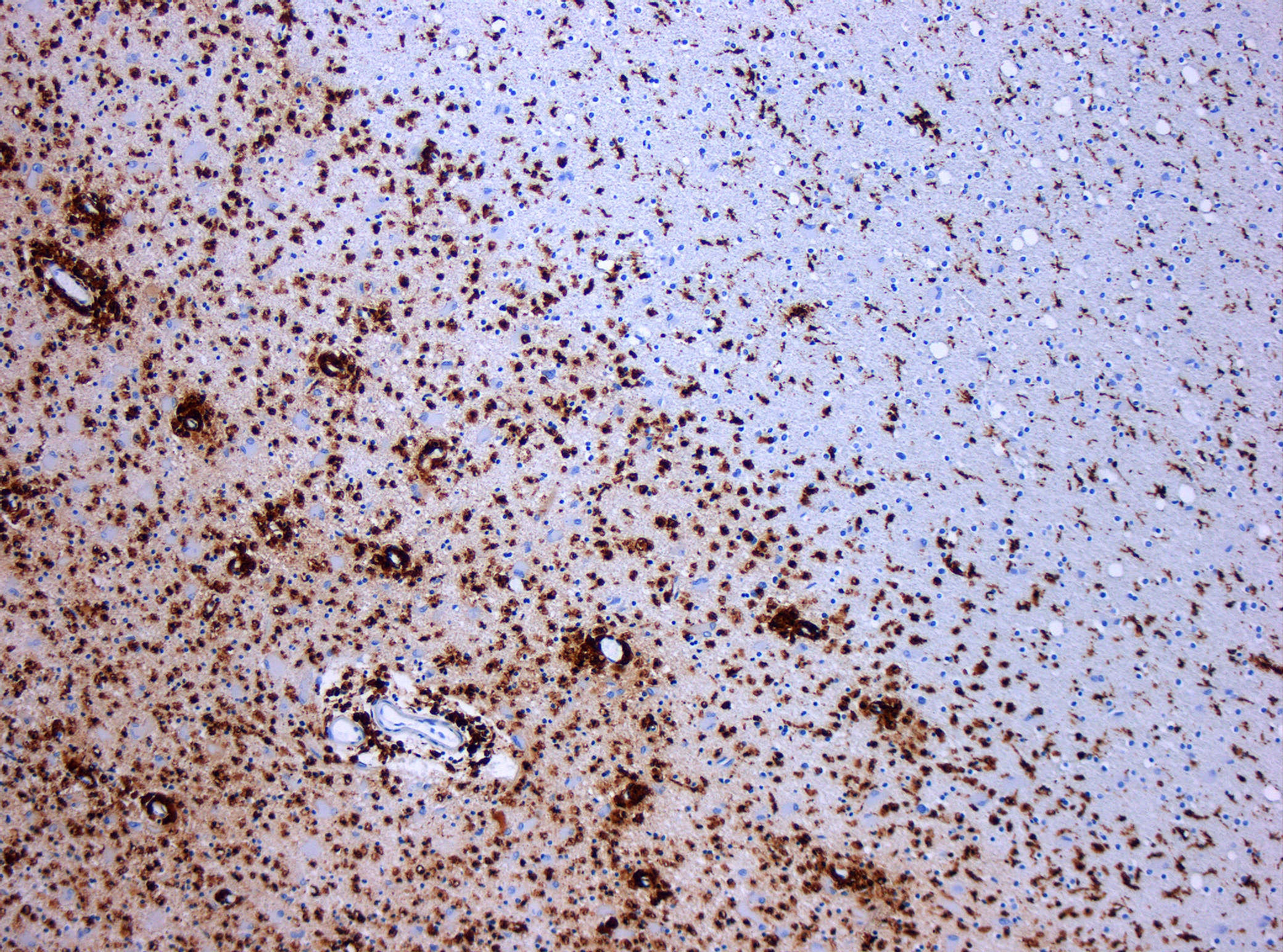
- Photomicrograph of a demyelinating MS-lesion: Immunohistochemical staining for CD68 highlights numerous macrophages (brown). Original magnification 10×.
- Specialty: Neurology

A demyelinating disease refers to any disease affecting the nervous system where the myelin sheath surrounding neurons is damaged. This damage disrupts the transmission of signals through the affected nerves, resulting in a decrease in their conduction ability. Consequently, this reduction in conduction can lead to deficiencies in sensation, movement, cognition, or other functions depending on the nerves affected.

Various factors can contribute to the development of demyelinating diseases, including genetic predisposition, infectious agents, autoimmune reactions, and other unknown factors. Proposed causes of demyelination include genetic predisposition, environmental factors such as viral infections or exposure to certain chemicals. Additionally, exposure to commercial insecticides like sheep dip, weed killers, and flea treatment preparations for pets, which contain organophosphates, can also lead to nerve demyelination. Chronic exposure to neuroleptic medications may also cause demyelination. Furthermore, deficiencies in vitamin B12 can result in dysmyelination.

Demyelinating diseases are traditionally classified into two types: demyelinating myelinoclastic diseases and demyelinating leukodystrophic diseases. In the first group, a healthy and normal myelin is destroyed by toxic substances, chemicals, or autoimmune reactions. In the second group, the myelin is inherently abnormal and undergoes degeneration. The Poser criteria named this second group dysmyelinating diseases.

In the most well-known demyelinating disease, multiple sclerosis, evidence suggests that the body's immune system plays a significant role. Acquired immune system cells, specifically T-cells, are found at the site of lesions. Other immune system cells, such as macrophages (and possibly mast cells), also contribute to the damage.

== Signs and symptoms ==
Symptoms and signs that present in demyelinating diseases are different for each condition. These symptoms and signs can present in a person with a demyelinating disease:

- Blurred double vision (Diplopia)
- Ataxia
- Clonus
- Dysarthria
- Fatigue
- Clumsiness
- Hand paralysis
- Hemiparesis
- Genital anaesthesia
- Incoordination
- Paresthesias
- Ocular paralysis (cranial nerve palsy)
- Impaired muscle coordination
- Weakness (muscle)
- Loss of sensation
- Impaired vision
- Unsteady gait
- Spastic paraparesis
- Incontinence
- Hearing problems
- Speech problems

== Evolutionary considerations ==
The role of prolonged cortical myelination in human evolution has been implicated as a contributing factor in some cases of demyelinating disease. Unlike other primates, humans exhibit a unique pattern of postpubertal myelination, which may contribute to the development of psychiatric disorders and neurodegenerative diseases that present in early adulthood and beyond. The extended period of cortical myelination in humans may allow greater opportunities for disruption in myelination, resulting in the onset of demyelinating disease. Furthermore, humans have significantly greater prefrontal white matter volume than other primate species, which implies greater myelin density. Increased myelin density in humans as a result of a prolonged myelination may, therefore, structure risk for myelin degeneration and dysfunction. Evolutionary considerations for the role of prolonged cortical myelination as a risk factor for demyelinating disease are particularly pertinent given that genetics and autoimmune deficiency hypotheses fail to explain many cases of demyelinating disease. As has been argued, diseases such as multiple sclerosis cannot be accounted for by autoimmune deficiency alone, but strongly imply the influence of flawed developmental processes in disease pathogenesis. Therefore, the role of the human-specific prolonged period of cortical myelination is an important evolutionary consideration in the pathogenesis of demyelinating disease.

== Diagnosis ==
Various methods/techniques are used to diagnose demyelinating diseases:

- Exclusion of other conditions that have overlapping symptoms
- Magnetic resonance imaging (MRI) is a medical imaging technique used in radiology to visualize internal structures of the body in detail. MRI makes use of the property of nuclear magnetic resonance (NMR) to image nuclei of atoms inside the body. This method is reliable because MRIs assess changes in proton density. "Spots" can occur as a result of changes in brain water content.
- Nerve Conduction Studies utilize electrical stimulation of nerves to study sensory and motor nerve conduction.
- Evoked potential is an electrical potential recorded from the nervous system following the presentation of a stimulus as detected by electroencephalography (EEG), electromyography (EMG), or other electrophysiological recording method.
- Cerebrospinal fluid analysis (CSF) can be extremely beneficial in the diagnosis of central nervous system infections. A CSF culture examination may yield the microorganism that caused the infection.
- Quantitative proton magnetic resonance spectroscopy (MRS) is a noninvasive analytical technique that has been used to study metabolic changes in brain tumors, strokes, seizure disorders, Alzheimer's disease, depression, and other diseases affecting the brain. It has also been used to study the metabolism of other organs such as muscles.
- Diagnostic criteria refers to a specific combination of signs, symptoms, and test results that the clinician uses in an attempt to determine the correct diagnosis.
- Fluid-attenuated inversion recovery (FLAIR) uses a pulse sequence to suppress cerebrospinal fluid and show lesions more clearly, and is used for example in multiple sclerosis evaluation.

=== Types ===
Demyelinating diseases can be divided in those affecting the central nervous system (CNS) and those affecting the peripheral nervous system (PNS). They can also be classified by the presence or absence of inflammation. Finally, a division may be made based on the underlying cause of demyelination: the disease process can be demyelinating myelinoclastic, wherein myelin is destroyed; or dysmyelinating leukodystrophic, wherein myelin is abnormal and degenerative.

==== CNS ====
The demyelinating disorders of the central nervous system include:

- Myelinoclastic or demyelinating disorders:
  - Typical forms of multiple sclerosis
  - Neuromyelitis optica, or Devic's disease
  - Idiopathic inflammatory demyelinating diseases
- Leukodystrophic or dysmyelinating disorders:
  - CNS neuropathies such as those produced by vitamin B_{12} deficiency
  - Central pontine myelinolysis
  - Myelopathies such as tabes dorsalis (syphilitic myelopathy)
  - Leukoencephalopathies such as progressive multifocal leukoencephalopathy
  - Leukodystrophies

The myelinoclastic disorders are typically associated with symptoms such as optic neuritis and transverse myelitis, because the demyelinating inflammation can affect the optic nerve or spinal cord. Many are idiopathic. Both myelinoclastic and leukodystrophic modes of disease may result in lesional demyelinations of the central nervous system.

==== PNS ====
Guillain–Barré syndrome – demyelination

The demyelinating diseases of the peripheral nervous system include:

- Guillain–Barré syndrome and its chronic counterpart, chronic inflammatory demyelinating polyneuropathy
- Anti-MAG peripheral neuropathy
- Charcot–Marie–Tooth disease and its counterpart Hereditary neuropathy with liability to pressure palsy
- Copper deficiency-associated conditions (peripheral neuropathy, myelopathy, and rarely optic neuropathy)
- Progressive inflammatory neuropathy

== Treatment ==
Treatments are patient-specific and depend on the symptoms that present with the disorder, as well as the progression of the condition. Improvements to the patient's life may be accomplished through the management of symptoms or slowing of the rate of demyelination. Treatment can include medication, lifestyle changes (i.e. smoking cessation, increased rest, and dietary changes), counselling, relaxation, physical exercise, patient education, and in some cases, deep brain thalamic stimulation (to ameliorate tremors).

== Prognosis ==
Prognosis depends on the condition itself. Some conditions such as MS depend on the subtype of the disease and various attributes of the patient such as age, sex, initial symptoms, and the degree of disability the patient experiences. Life expectancy in MS patients is 5 to 10 years lower than unaffected people. MS is an inflammatory demyelinating disease of the central nervous system (CNS) that develops in genetically susceptible individuals after exposure to unknown environmental trigger(s). The bases for MS are unknown but are strongly suspected to involve immune reactions against autoantigens, particularly myelin proteins. The most accepted hypothesis is that dialogue between T-cell receptors and myelin antigens leads to an immune attack on the myelin-oligodendrocyte complex. These interactions between active T cells and myelin antigens provoke a massive destructive inflammatory response and promote continuing proliferation of T and B cells and macrophage activation, which sustains secretion of inflammatory mediators. Other conditions such as central pontine myelinolysis have about a third of patients recover and the other two-thirds experience varying degrees of disability. In some cases, such as transverse myelitis, the patient can begin recovery as early as 2 to 12 weeks after the onset of the condition.

== Epidemiology ==
Incidence of demyelinating diseases varies by disorder. Some conditions, such as tabes dorsalis appear predominantly in males and begin in midlife. Optic neuritis, though, occurs preferentially in females typically between the ages of 30 and 35. Other conditions such as multiple sclerosis vary in prevalence depending on the country and population. This condition can appear in children and adults.

== Research ==
Much of the research conducted on demyelinating diseases is targeted towards discovering the mechanisms by which these disorders function in an attempt to develop therapies and treatments for individuals affected by these conditions. For example, proteomics has revealed several proteins which contribute to the pathophysiology of demyelinating diseases. For example, COX-2 has been implicated in oligodendrocyte death in animal models of demyelination. The presence of myelin debris has been correlated with damaging inflammation as well as poor regeneration, due to the presence of inhibitory myelin components.

N-cadherin is expressed in regions of active remyelination and may play an important role in generating a local environment conducive to remyelination. N-cadherin agonists have been identified and observed to stimulate neurite growth and cell migration, key aspects of promoting axon growth and remyelination after injury or disease.

Immunomodulatory drugs such as fingolimod have been shown to reduce immune-mediated damage to the CNS, preventing further damage in patients with MS. The drug targets the role of macrophages in disease progression.

CNS-selective thyromimetics may become a viable strategy to protect myelin and promote remyelination in MS patients. It has been shown that intranasal administration of apotransferrin (aTf) can protect myelin and induce remyelination in mice. Finally, electrical stimulation which activates neural stem cells may provide a method by which regions of demyelination can be repaired.

== In other animals ==
Demyelinating diseases/disorders have been found worldwide in various animals. Some of these animals include mice, pigs, cattle, hamsters, rats, sheep, Siamese kittens, and a number of dog breeds (including Chow Chow, Springer Spaniel, Dalmatian, Samoyed, Golden Retriever, Lurcher, Bernese Mountain Dog, Vizsla, Weimaraner, Australian Silky Terrier, and mixed breeds).

Ziggy Star, a female northern fur seal, was treated at the Marine Mammal Center beginning in March 2014 and was noted as the first reported case of a demyelinating disease in a marine mammal. She was later transported to Mystic Aquarium & Institute for Exploration for lifelong care as an ambassador to the public. In 2017, she was the first seal treated for hydrocephalus.

== See also ==
- Degenerative disease
- Multiple sclerosis borderline
- The Lesion Project (multiple sclerosis)
- The Myelin Project
- Myelin Repair Foundation
