= Acute disseminated encephalomyelitis =

Autoimmune disease

- Other names: Acute demyelinating encephalomyelitis
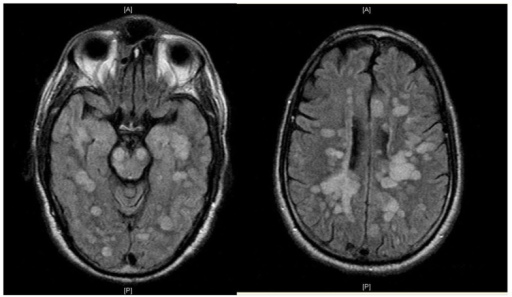
- Fulminating ADEM showing many lesions. The patient survived, but remained in a persistent vegetative state
- Specialty: Neurology

Acute disseminated encephalomyelitis (ADEM), or acute demyelinating encephalomyelitis, is a rare autoimmune disease marked by a sudden, widespread attack of inflammation in the brain and spinal cord. As well as causing the brain and spinal cord to become inflamed, ADEM also attacks the nerves of the central nervous system and damages their myelin insulation, which, as a result, destroys the white matter. The cause is often a trigger such as from viral infection or, in extraordinarily rare cases, vaccinations.

ADEM's symptoms resemble those of multiple sclerosis (MS), so the disease itself is sorted into the classification of the multiple sclerosis borderline diseases. However, ADEM has several features that distinguish it from MS. Unlike MS, ADEM occurs usually in children and is marked with rapid fever, although adolescents and adults can get the disease too. ADEM consists of a single flare-up, whereas MS is marked with several flare-ups (or relapses) over a long period of time. Relapses following ADEM are reported in up to a quarter of patients. However, the majority of these 'multiphasic' presentations following ADEM likely represent MS. ADEM is also distinguished by a loss of consciousness, coma and death, which is very rare in MS, except in severe cases.

It affects about 8 per 1,000,000 people per year. Although it occurs in all ages, most reported cases are in children and adolescents, with the average age around 5 to 8 years old. The disease affects males and females almost equally. ADEM shows seasonal variation with higher incidence in winter and spring months which may coincide with higher viral infections during these months. The mortality rate may be as high as 5%; however, full recovery is seen in 50 to 75% of cases with increase in survival rates up to 70 to 90% with figures including minor residual disability as well. The average time to recover from ADEM flare-ups is one to six months.

ADEM produces multiple inflammatory lesions in the brain and spinal cord, particularly in the white matter. Usually these are found in the subcortical and central white matter and cortical gray-white junction of both cerebral hemispheres, cerebellum, brainstem, and spinal cord, but periventricular white matter and gray matter of the cortex, thalami and basal ganglia may also be involved.

When a person has more than one demyelinating episode of ADEM, the disease is then called recurrent disseminated encephalomyelitis or multiphasic disseminated encephalomyelitis (MDEM). Also, a fulminant course in adults has been described.

== Signs and symptoms ==
ADEM has an abrupt onset and a monophasic course. Symptoms usually begin 1–3 weeks after infection. Major symptoms include fever, headache, nausea and vomiting, confusion, vision impairment, drowsiness, seizures and coma. Although initially the symptoms are usually mild, they worsen rapidly over the course of hours to days, with the average time to maximum severity being about four and a half days. Additional symptoms include hemiparesis, paraparesis, and cranial nerve palsies.

=== ADEM in COVID-19 ===
Neurological symptoms were the main presentation of COVID-19, which did not correlate with the severity of respiratory symptoms. The high incidence of ADEM with hemorrhage is striking. Brain inflammation is likely caused by an immune response to the disease rather than neurotropism. Cerebrospinal fluid analysis was not indicative of an infectious process, neurological impairment was not present in the acute phase of the infection, and neuroimaging findings were not typical of classical toxic and metabolic disorders. The finding of bilateral periventricular relatively asymmetrical lesions allied with deep white matter involvement, that may also be present in cortical gray-white matter junction, thalami, basal ganglia, cerebellum, and brainstem suggests an acute demyelination process. Additionally, hemorrhagic white matter lesions, clusters of macrophages related to axonal injury and ADEM-like appearance were also found in subcortical white matter.

== Causes ==
Since the discovery of the anti-MOG specificity against multiple sclerosis diagnosis, it is considered that ADEM is one of the possible clinical causes of anti-MOG associated encephalomyelitis.

There are several theories about how the anti-MOG antibodies appear in the patient's serum:

- A preceding antigenic challenge can be identified in approximately two-thirds of people. Some viral infections thought to induce ADEM include influenza virus, dengue, enterovirus, measles, mumps, rubella, varicella zoster, Epstein–Barr virus, cytomegalovirus, herpes simplex virus, hepatitis A, coxsackievirus and COVID-19. Bacterial infections include Mycoplasma pneumoniae, Borrelia burgdorferi, Leptospira, and beta-hemolytic Streptococci.
- Exposure to vaccines: The only vaccine proven related to ADEM is the Semple form of the rabies vaccine, but hepatitis B, pertussis, diphtheria, measles, mumps, rubella, pneumococcus, varicella, influenza, Japanese encephalitis, and polio vaccines have all been associated with the condition. The majority of the studies that correlate vaccination with ADEM onset use only small samples or are case studies. Large-scale epidemiological studies (e.g., of MMR vaccine or smallpox vaccine) do not show increased risk of ADEM following vaccination. An upper bound for the risk of ADEM from measles vaccination, if it exists, can be estimated to be 10 per million, which is far lower than the risk of developing ADEM from an actual measles infection, which is about 1 per 1,000 cases. For a rubella infection, the risk is 1 per 5,000 cases. Some early vaccines, later shown to have been contaminated with host animal central nervous system tissue, had ADEM incidence rates as high as 1 in 600.
- In rare cases, ADEM seems to follow from organ transplantation.

== Diagnosis ==
The term ADEM has been inconsistently used at different times. Currently, the commonly accepted international standard for the clinical case definition is the one published by the International Pediatric MS Study Group, revision 2007.

Given that the definition is clinical, it is currently unknown if all the cases of ADEM are positive for anti-MOG autoantibody; in any case, it appears to be strongly related to ADEM diagnosis.

=== Differential diagnosis ===
==== Multiple sclerosis ====
While ADEM and MS both involve autoimmune demyelination, they differ in many clinical, genetic, imaging, and histopathological aspects. Some authors consider MS and its borderline forms to constitute a spectrum, differing only in chronicity, severity, and clinical course, while others consider them discretely different diseases.

Typically, ADEM appears in children following an antigenic challenge and remains monophasic. Nevertheless, ADEM does occur in adults, and can also be clinically multiphasic.

Problems for differential diagnosis increase due to the lack of agreement on a definition of multiple sclerosis. If MS were defined only by the separation in time and space of the demyelinating lesions as McDonald did, it would not be enough to make a difference, as some cases of ADEM satisfy these conditions. Therefore, some authors propose to establish the dividing line as the shape of the lesions around the veins, being therefore "perivenous vs. confluent demyelination".

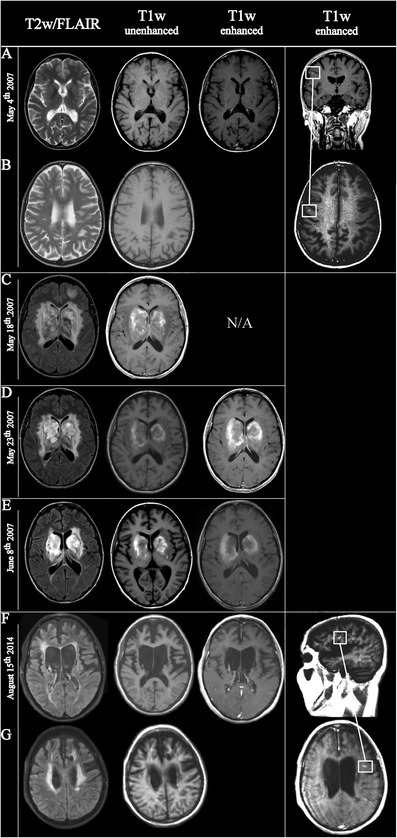
Acute hemorrhagic Leukoencephalitis in a patient with Multiple sclerosis.

The pathology of ADEM is very similar to that of MS, with some differences. The pathological hallmark of ADEM is perivenous inflammation with limited "sleeves of demyelination". Nevertheless, MS-like plaques (confluent demyelination) can appear

Plaques in the white matter in MS are sharply delineated, while the glial scar in ADEM is smooth. Axons are better preserved in ADEM lesions. Inflammation in ADEM is widely disseminated and ill-defined, and finally, lesions are strictly perivenous, while in MS they are disposed around veins, but not so sharply.

Nevertheless, the co-occurrence of perivenous and confluent demyelination in some individuals suggests pathogenic overlap between acute disseminated encephalomyelitis and multiple sclerosis and misclassification even with biopsy or even postmortem ADEM in adults can progress to MS

==== Multiphasic disseminated encephalomyelitis ====
When the person has more than one demyelinating episode of ADEM, the disease is then called recurrent disseminated encephalomyelitis or multiphasic disseminated encephalomyelitis (MDEM).

It has been found that anti-MOG auto-antibodies are related to this kind of ADEM

Another variant of ADEM in adults, also related to anti-MOG auto-antibodies, has been named fulminant disseminated encephalomyelitis, and it has been reported to be clinically ADEM, but showing MS-like lesions on autopsy. It has been classified inside the anti-MOG associated inflammatory demyelinating diseases.

==== Acute hemorrhagic leukoencephalitis ====
Acute hemorrhagic leukoencephalitis (AHL, or AHLE), acute hemorrhagic encephalomyelitis (AHEM), acute necrotizing hemorrhagic leukoencephalitis (ANHLE), Weston-Hurst syndrome, or Hurst's disease, is a hyperacute and frequently fatal form of ADEM. AHL is relatively rare (less than 100 cases have been reported in the medical literature as of 2006), it is seen in about 2% of ADEM cases, and is characterized by necrotizing vasculitis of venules and hemorrhage, and edema. Death is common in the first week and overall mortality is about 70%, but increasing evidence points to favorable outcomes after aggressive treatment with corticosteroids, immunoglobulins, cyclophosphamide, and plasma exchange. About 70% of survivors show residual neurological deficits, but some survivors have shown surprisingly little deficit considering the extent of the white matter affected.

This disease has been occasionally associated with ulcerative colitis and Crohn's disease, malaria, sepsis associated with immune complex deposition, methanol poisoning, and other underlying conditions. Also, anecdotal association with MS has been reported

Laboratory studies that support the diagnosis of AHL are: peripheral leukocytosis, cerebrospinal fluid (CSF) pleocytosis associated with normal glucose and increased protein. On magnetic resonance imaging (MRI), lesions of AHL typically show extensive T2-weighted and fluid-attenuated inversion recovery (FLAIR) white matter hyperintensities with areas of hemorrhage, significant edema, and mass effect.

== Treatment ==
No controlled clinical trials have been conducted on ADEM treatment, but aggressive treatment aimed at rapidly reducing inflammation of the CNS is standard. The widely accepted first-line treatment is high doses of intravenous corticosteroids, such as methylprednisolone or dexamethasone, followed by 3–6 weeks of gradually lower oral doses of prednisolone. Patients treated with methylprednisolone have shown better outcomes than those treated with dexamethasone. Oral tapers of less than three weeks duration show a higher chance of relapsing, and tend to show poorer outcomes. Other anti-inflammatory and immunosuppressive therapies have been reported to show beneficial effect, such as plasmapheresis, high doses of intravenous immunoglobulin (IVIg), mitoxantrone and cyclophosphamide. These are considered alternative therapies, used when corticosteroids cannot be used or fail to show an effect.

There is some evidence to suggest that patients may respond to a combination of methylprednisolone and immunoglobulins if they fail to respond to either separately In a study of 16 children with ADEM, 10 recovered completely after high-dose methylprednisolone, one severe case that failed to respond to steroids recovered completely after IV Ig; the five most severe cases – with ADAM and severe peripheral neuropathy – were treated with combined high-dose methylprednisolone and immunoglobulin, two remained paraplegic, one had motor and cognitive handicaps, and two recovered. A recent review of IVIg treatment of ADEM (of which the previous study formed the bulk of the cases) found that 70% of children showed complete recovery after treatment with IVIg, or IVIg plus corticosteroids. A study of IVIg treatment in adults with ADEM showed that IVIg seems more effective in treating sensory and motor disturbances, while steroids seem more effective in treating impairments of cognition, consciousness, and rigor. This same study found one subject, a 71-year-old man who had not responded to steroids, who responded to an IVIg treatment 58 days after disease onset.

== Prognosis ==
Full recovery is seen in 50 to 70% of cases, ranging to 70 to 90% recovery with some minor residual disability (typically assessed using measures such as mRS or EDSS), average time to recover is one to six months. The mortality rate may be as high as 5–10%. Poorer outcomes are associated with unresponsiveness to steroid therapy, unusually severe neurological symptoms, or sudden onset. Children tend to have more favorable outcomes than adults, and cases presenting without fevers tend to have poorer outcomes. The latter effect may be due to either the protective effects of fever or the fact that diagnosis and treatment are sought more rapidly when fever is present.

ADEM can progress to MS. It will be considered MS if some lesions appear in different times and brain areas

=== Motor deficits ===
Residual motor deficits are estimated to remain in about 8 to 30% of cases, the range in severity from mild clumsiness to ataxia and hemiparesis.

=== Neurocognitive ===
Patients with demyelinating illnesses, such as MS, have shown cognitive deficits even when there is minimal physical disability. Research suggests that similar effects are seen after ADEM, but that the deficits are less severe than those seen in MS. A study of six children with ADEM (mean age at presentation 7.7 years) were tested for a range of neurocognitive tests after an average of 3.5 years of recovery. All six children performed in the normal range on most tests, including verbal IQ and performance IQ, but performed at least one standard deviation below age norms in at least one cognitive domain, such as complex attention (one child), short-term memory (one child) and internalizing behaviour/affect (two children). Group means for each cognitive domain were all within one standard deviation of age norms, demonstrating that, as a group, they were normal. These deficits were less severe than those seen in similar aged children with a diagnosis of MS.

Another study compared nineteen children with a history of ADEM, of which 10 were five years of age or younger at the time (average age 3.8 years old, tested an average of 3.9 years later), and nine were older (mean age 7.7 years at time of ADEM, tested an average of 2.2 years later), to nineteen matched controls. Scores on IQ tests and educational achievement were lower for the young onset ADEM group (average IQ 90) compared to the late onset (average IQ 100) and control groups (average IQ 106), while the late onset ADEM children scored lower on verbal processing speed. Again, all group means were within one standard deviation of the controls, meaning that while effects were statistically reliable, the children as a whole were still within the normal range. There were also more behavioural problems in the early onset group, although there is some suggestion that this may be due, at least in part, to the stress of hospitalization at a young age.

== Research ==
The relationship between ADEM and anti-MOG-associated encephalomyelitis is currently under research. A new entity called MOGDEM has been proposed.

About animal models, the main animal model for MS, experimental autoimmune encephalomyelitis (EAE) is also an animal model for ADEM. Being an acute monophasic illness, EAE is far more similar to ADEM than MS.

== See also ==
- Optic neuritis
- Transverse myelitis
- Meningitis-retention syndrome
- Victoria Arlen
