= Multiple sclerosis drug pipeline =

Overview article

There are several ways for pharmaceuticals for treating multiple sclerosis (MS) to reach the market.

Novel pharmaceuticals cannot enter the US market without FDA approval, which typically requires evidence of safety and efficacy in human trials and large fees be submitted to the FDA and found to be adequate.

Pharmaceuticals already on the market, such as vitamin D, do not have to and may never have had do so, and the financial incentives to do so are relatively insignificant. Thus lack of approval of such drugs implies neither efficacy nor lack of efficacy.

In general, novel pharmaceuticals cannot enter a market without government approval; standards and political influences vary.

== Approved medication ==
The typical path to approval in the 21st century may include basic research leading to understanding of mechanisms of disease progression and prevention such as chemical pathways, or candidate medications that aid or interfere with such pathways, which may be tested in vitro or in an animal model. Later, three typically sequential phases of testing in humans are common. Promising results regarding safety, efficacy, and side effects are generally needed at each major phase of development.

Usually the regulatory agencies approve a multiple sclerosis medication for a specific clinical course. Treatments for RRMS (relapsing-remitting), SPMS (secondary progressive), or PPMS (primary progressive) are common. Sometimes they approve it for a subtype, like highly-active MS (HAMS, inside RRMS), rapidly-worsening MS (RWMS, inside PPMS), or "active SPMS" (previous progressive-relapsing)

=== Approved for relapsing-remitting ===
As of 2021, the approved drugs for relapsing-remitting multiple sclerosis (RRMS) are:

- Two interferons: beta-1a and beta-1b (injections)
- Three generic immunomodulators:
  - Glatiramer acetate (Copaxone, injection)
  - Teriflunomide (Aubagio),
- Monomethyl fumarate itself and its two precursors, which alters the NRF2 (nuclear factor erythroid 2(NF-E2)-related factor 2) transcription factor:
  - Dimethyl fumarate (Tecfidera),
  - Diroximel fumarate (Vumerity), approved by the FDA in October 2019.
  - Active principal monomethyl fumarate itself, (Bafiertam), approved in April 2020.
- Four S1P modulators:
  - Fingolimod (Gilenya), an oral treatment and the first oral therapy approved for multiple sclerosis.
  - Siponimod (Mayzent), oral. Approved in March 2019 for CIS, RRMS and SPMS
  - Ozanimod: oral. It was approved by the FDA in March 2020 with the trade name Zeposia
  - Ponesimod (Ponvory)
- Five monoclonal antibodies:
  - Alemtuzumab (Lemtrada, Campath).
  - Natalizumab (Tysabri)
  - Ocrelizumab (Ocrevus) which is also approved for primary progressive (PPMS)
  - Ofatumumab (Kesimpta) is another anti-CD20 monoclonal antibody.
  - Ublituximab (Briumvi) was approved for medical use in the United States in December 2022, with the name Briumvi, for relapsing forms, clinically isolated syndrome, relapsing-remitting disease, and active secondary progressive.

There are reports comparing these treatments in front of each other. Restricting the research only to relapses, it seems that alemtuzumab is the most cost effective while anti-CD20 monoclonal antibodies (Rituxan, Ocrevus) have the better safety vs. efficacy profile

=== Approved for special courses ===
The courses primary progressive (PPMS) and secondary progressive (SPMS) are normally treated apart from RRMS. Besides, the regulatory agencies treat sometimes apart the cases aSPMS (Active Secondary progressive), nSPMS(non-active SPMS), HAMS (highly active) and RPMS (rapidly progressive)

- Primary progressive: Ocrelizumab and mitoxantrone are the only approved drugs for PPMS. The last with restrictions.
- Secondary progressive (SPMS, nSPMS, non-active SPMS): Ozanimod, cladribine and mitoxantrone are approved for SPMS. The last with restrictions. Though approved for SPMS its profile is considered dangerous and is not always risk worthy Cladribine was approved also for SPMS (secondary progressive) in Europe in 2017 and by FDA in April 2019 with the name Mavenclad.
- Active SPMS (aSPMS, formerly progressive-relapsing): In the US, the approval of cladribine includes active SPMS (aSPMS, SPMS with relapses) in its approval. Also siponimod, ofatumumab and Ublituximab are approved for this special course "active SPMS"
- Highly active MS (HAMS): As of 2020, cladribine is the only drug specifically approved for HAMS.
- Rapidly progressive MS (RPMS): For aggressive MS or rapidly progressive multiple sclerosis only mitoxantrone is approved

=== Withdrawn medication ===
- daclizumab Finally, after some reported deaths, it has been withdrawn by the regulatory agencies that had it previously approved.

== Phase III ==
Phase III programs consist of studies on large patient groups (300 to 3,000 or more) and are aimed at being the definitive assessment of how effective and safe a test drug will be. It is the last stage of drug development and is followed by a submission to the appropriate regulatory agencies (e.g., European Medicines Agency (EMA) for the European Union, the Food and Drug Administration (FDA) for the United States, Therapeutic Goods Administration (TGA) for Australia, etc.) to obtain approval for marketing. Treatment in MS Phase III studies is usually two years per patient. In July 2021, the FDA gave the go-ahead for an investigational new drug application (IND) for the phase 3 ENSURE program, which will evaluate IMU-838 in patients with relapsing-remitting multiple sclerosis (RRMS). Immunic also announced that a separate IND application for the supportive phase 2 CALLIPER trial of IMU-838 in patients with progressive multiple sclerosis has been cleared as well. The ENSURE program consists of two identical, double-blind, twin phase 3 trials, titled ENSURE-1 and ENSURE-2, designed to evaluate the efficacy, safety, and tolerability of IMU-838 in a 30-mg daily dose versus placebo in patients with RRMS. Approximately 1050 adult patients with active RRMS are expected to be enrolled in the studies and will be evaluated on time to first relapse as the primary end point. Both trials will run concurrently, with dosing of the first patient expected in the second half of 2021.2

- masitinib, anticancer drug that blocks cell replication and immune responses, It targets the innate immune system (mast cells and microglia) and has shown efficacy in the progressive courses. The appropriate pathway to put forward masitinib through the regulatory agencies, for the treatment of progressive forms of multiple sclerosis, is under study
- evobrutinib is a selective oral Bruton's tyrosine kinase (BTK) inhibitor that has been shown to inhibit B-cell activation both in vitro and in vivo. In phase III. The results in phase III are much below expectations and the drug failed.
- tolebrutinib, in phase III but currently on hold. Expected FDA submission on 2024
- simvastatin, a cholesterol-lowering statin, has shown good results in progressive variants. This has shown brain atrophy reduction in secondary progressive MS. This drug is under research for PPMS and SPMS in phase III.

== Phase II ==
Phase II studies are performed on mid-sized groups of patients (20 to 300) and are designed to assess whether a drug works in the targeted disease area, as well as to continue earlier safety assessments obtained in healthy volunteers. Treatment in MS phase II studies is with 4–12 months usually shorter than in phase III studies.

- amiselimod, S1P modulator
- amiloride (Midamor) - Midamor is a sodium channel blocker. It can stop sodium from entering the nerve cells, which in turn reduces the release of calcium. Therefore, Midamor could have a neuroprotective function in MS patients
- ATL1102 (under development by Teva and Antisense therapeutics) is a second-generation antisense inhibitor of CD49d, a subunit of VLA-4 (Very Late Antigen-4). Results of a Phase IIa have been reported.
- CDP323 (under development by UCB S.A. and Biogen) is a compound for oral intake acting against α4-integrin, i.e., it has the same mechanism of action as natalizumab. Phase II investigations started in 2007.
- clemastine fumarate, also known as meclastin, is an antihistamine and anticholinergic drug. Between Jan 1, 2014, and April 11, 2015, it performed well in a Phase II clinical trial
- estradiol, estriol, and estrogen receptors(ER): Estrogens have been shown to be anti-inflammatory and neuroprotective in a variety of neurological disease models and it is known that they work also in presence of inflammation. Research in this area has focused on the efficacy of estriol as a treatment to reduce symptoms of relapse-remitting multiple sclerosis in non-pregnant women.
- ibudilast: A phase II trial shows that Ibudilast does not reduce lesion rate, but prevents them to turn into black holes. They classify its action as class III evidence of delay on disease activity In March 2016 Ibudilast was designated a FDA fast track candidate for progressive MS. Anyway as of 2020 is still on phase II.
- inosine: Inosine is a compound that has shown interesting preliminary results in Phase I and II clinical trials. Two different mechanisms of action have been proposed. First, it produces uric acid after ingestion, which is a natural antioxidant; second, it has been shown to induce axonal rewiring in laboratory animals with stroke, and spinal cord injury. However it can cause health problems in a long-term treatment, mainly kidney stones. It seems that its mechanism of action is peroxynitrite inactivation Other reports point to an immune modulation
- Stem cell transplantation was found feasible in a Phase I/II study in 21 patients with relapsing-remitting MS not responsive to interferon beta. It involves collecting some of the patient's own peripheral blood stem cells, giving low-intensity chemotherapy to eliminate auto-reactive lymphocytes, and then reinfusing the stem cells. Earlier studies in the secondary-progressive stage of MS have failed to show reversal of neurological symptoms.
- temelimab or Geneuro GNbAC1 - Monoclonal antibody against the viral The HERV-W envelope glycoprotein, which is supposed to be somehow pathogenic. It has passed a Phase IIb and a high dosis safety profile study In Phase IIb
- fluoxetine (Prozac)
- riluzole (Rilutek)
- orelabrutinib and fenebrutinib

== Phase I and animal models ==
Phase I and medicaments used in animal models include, but are not limited to:

- GIFT15 is a treatment which suppresses the immune system, and has been successfully used in the treatment of mice. The immune system attacks the central nervous system in Multiple Sclerosis patients. Specifically a "granulocyte-macrophage colony–stimulating factor (GM-CSF) and interleukin-15 (IL-15) 'fusokine' (GIFT15) exerts immune suppression via aberrant signaling through the IL-15 receptor on lymphomyeloid cells. We show here that ex vivo GIFT15 treatment of mouse splenocytes generates suppressive regulatory cells of B cell ontogeny (hereafter called GIFT15 Breg cells)."
- bosentan, endothelin-1 antagonist, has been proposed to lower the ET1 levels, which are involved in brain hypoperfusion
- carnosol, a natural compound found in Rosemary, which has been found to prevent microglia activation
- metformin - A drug that reverses age-related (but also injury-related) changes in olegodendrocytes, making OPCs respond to differentiation factors.

== First and second lines ==
Because of the side effects and dangers of some medications, they are classified into first and second line. First line includes the safest but less effective compounds, i.e. interferons and glatimer acetate. The second line includes the rest of the compounds and is usually a stronger medication.

Some MS organizations separate medications into three lines:

- Moderately effective: teriflunomide (Aubagio), beta Interferons (1a and 1b) and glatiramer acetate.
- More effective: cladribine (Mavenclad), dimethyl fumarate (Tecfidera) and fingolimod (Gilenya)
- Highly effective: ocrelizumab (Ocrevus) and natalizumab (Tysabri)

== Off- and open label ==
Some compounds have regulatory (e.g. FDA) approval, having been shown to be safe and effective for another purpose, however, they are not approved specifically for MS. This may be because of lack of funding to go through the approval process. Some doctors prescribe them off-label or under the schema of open label research. Examples of MS drugs used off label include:

- rituximab - Monoclonal antibody against CD20. According to some sources it has a better efficacy vs. safety profile than most approved drugs.
- cyclophosphamide - Strong immunosuppressor with conflicting evidence.
- Low-Dose Naltrexone (LDN).
- filgrastim

== Research into progressive variants ==
Progressive MS (PPMS and SPMS) is more difficult to treat than RRMS. Relapsing-onset variants (RO), even when they turn into progressive MS, are easier to treat than progressive-onset variants. Though difficult to treat, SPMS and progressive-relapsing MS are easier to treat than PPMS. Ocrelizumab has been approved for PPMS and for active SPMS with relapses. Mitoxantrone has been approved for them but is rarely used due to severe risks. Several therapies are under research.

Cyclophosphamide (Revimmune) is in Phase III trials for secondary progressive MS. It was also studied for RRMS but the company does not pursue actively this path. In a 2006 study for refractory cases it showed some effectiveness A 2007 open label study found it equivalent to mitoxantrone and in 2008 evidence appeared that it can reverse disability.

Some PPMS patients with a special biomarker (Immunoglobulin M oligoclonal bands) have been shown to respond to standard RRMS medications, though there is only preliminary evidence waiting to be confirmed

== Other possible treatments under research ==
- Antimicrobial agents against Chlamydophila pneumoniae: MS patients are more likely to have detectable levels of Chlamydophila pneumoniae DNA in their cerebrospinal fluid, compared to other patients with neurological diseases; however these findings are insufficient to establish an etiologic relation. Anecdotal reports of the use of antimicrobial agents against Chlamydophila pneumoniae are favorable, but only one double-blind placebo-controlled trial has been published, in which the number of patients studied was too small (four in each arm of the trial) to reach statistical significance in the primary outcome measure (volume of gadolinium-enhancing lesions, as viewed on MRI).
- Antioxidants, available as supplements, are reported to reduce the blood–brain barrier permeability. Related to this, MS patients have been reported to have low levels of uric acid, which is a natural antioxidant, and has been observed that raising uric acid levels protects against blood–brain barrier destruction (through peroxynitrite scavenging ). Peroxynitrite has been correlated with the axons degeneration and its removal can protect neurons from further damage after an attack. They can also remove other reactive oxygen species It is also known that uric acid levels decrease during the course of the disease
- bilirubin has been found to have immunomodulatory properties, apart from the already known antioxidant properties and it is a possible future treatment.
- Use of drugs to suppress myelin-reactive effector memory T cells by blocking voltage-gated Kv1.3 channels in these cells.
- hydralazine: Due to its ability to damage myelin nerve sheaths, acrolein may be a factor in the development of multiple sclerosis. The antihypertensive drug hydralazine, a known scavenger of acrolein, was found to reduce myelin damage and significantly improve behavioral outcomes in a mouse model of multiple sclerosis (experimental autoimmune encephalomyelitis).
- Helminthic therapy: A study showed a negative association between MS and infection with intestinal parasites, such as hookworm, indicating that parasites may protect against multiple sclerosis. Helminth therapy involves ingesting helminth eggs by the names of Trichuris suis, which are non parasitic worms. This is done in hopes that the body will redirect the immune response away from attacking the myelin, which produce lesions and target the helminths. The study by Dr Fleming shows this is affective in reducing the extent of lesions seen through MRI's taken before and after the study.
- BCG vaccine: The common, live, attenuated vaccine against tuberculosis, has substantially reduced recurrence of symptoms in multiple sclerosis patients. The frequency of new enhancing lesions as detected by Gd-enhanced MRI was reduced by more than half in 12 patients, comparing the six-month run-in phase to the six-month post BCG phase of the experiment. Persistence at subsequent MR scan was reduced from 18 to 1 lesion, and evolution to black holes was reduced from 28 to 6 lesions. The conventional explanation of such protection is that parasites (including bacteria) modulate the sensitivity of the immune system. BCG appears safe as a treatment for multiple sclerosis.
- Low dose naltrexone is also known as LDN. Naltrexone, a pure opiate antagonist, licensed by the FDA for the treatment of alcohol and opioid addictions, is being studied at a lower dosage for MS patients. A small, short-duration clinical trial with MS patients was conducted at the University of California, San Francisco. In October 2007 data was presented at the European Congress of MS in Prague regarding safety findings of a pilot study of low dose naltrexone therapy in multiple sclerosis by neurological researchers in Milan, Italy. However, no compelling efficacy results for LDN in MS therapy have been published. LDN is available to MS patients in the US by off-label prescription.
- minocycline: the antibiotic minocycline has shown an effect on clinical and magnetic resonance imaging (MRI) outcomes and serum immune molecules in MS patients over 24 months of open-label minocycline treatment. Despite a moderately high pretreatment relapse rate in patients in the study prior to treatment, no relapses occurred between months 6 and 24. The only patient with gadolinium-enhancing lesions on MRI at 12 and 24 months was on half-dose minocycline. Clinical and MRI outcomes in this study were supported by systemic immunological changes and call for further investigation of minocycline in MS.
- pixantrone: pixantrone (BBR2778) is an analogue of mitoxantrone devoid of toxic effects on cardiac tissue. It is as potent as mitoxantrone in animal models of MS; however, results of human trials had not been published in 2007.
- Plasmapheresis. Pattern II MS lesions have been reported to respond to plasmapheresis, which points to something pathogenic into the blood serum, and the percentage reported of pattern II is very close to the 47% reported in Kir4.1 MS cases, turning Kir4.1 patients into candidates for plasma exchange.
- Prolactin: In 2007 it was published that the hormone prolactin can ease the effects of demyelination in animal models of MS. This effect of prolactin may be the reason why pregnancy tends to reduce the effects of multiple sclerosis in women.
- Statins: a family of cholesterol-lowering drugs, the statins, have shown anti-inflammatory effects in animal models of MS. However, there is no evidence that statins are beneficial in the treatment of human MS patients, and concerns exist that, if ever shown to be effective, the high doses needed would prevent long-term use due to the potential for liver damage and muscle-wasting disease. One of them, Atorvastatin, has been tried in combination with several approved treatments, though with little success. Other, Simvastatin (Zocor) has shown good results in progressive variants
- Testosterone has been studied for its potential benefits in men with Multiple Sclerosis, but the results are preliminary.
- Vitamin D: a 2004 study found that women who took vitamin D supplements were 40% less likely to develop MS than women who did not take supplements. However, this study does not provide enough data to conclude that vitamin D has a beneficial influence on ongoing MS. Furthermore, it could not distinguish between a beneficial effect of vitamin D and that of multivitamin supplements including vitamin E and various B vitamins, which may also exert a protective effect. A new study on this in the same sense was published in 2013
- Omega-3 fatty acid: One study found that Omega-3 fatty acid supplementation decreases matrix metalloproteinase-9 production in relapsing-remitting multiple sclerosis

== Combined therapies ==
Several combinations of drugs have been tested. Some of them are couples of approved drugs. Other tests try one approved drug with one experimental substance. Finally, at some point there could appear some trials testing couples of non-approved drugs.

As of 2016, there are 10 active principles approved which are: Two interferons (interferon beta-1a and interferon beta-1b), glatiramer acetate, mitoxantrone, fingolimod, teriflunomide, dimethyl fumarate and finally three monoclonal antibodies (natalizumab, alemtuzumab and since May 2016, daclizumab)

=== Combination of approved drugs ===
- mitoxantrone and glatiramer acetate: A study in the United Kingdom revealed interesting results, when using a combination of mitoxantrone and glatiramer acetate. In an open-label study of 27 patients with RRMS, the results suggested a rapid and sustained suppression of relapses. A three-year controlled study of 60 patients is now being launched at 10 centres across the UK. In another clinical trial, glatiramer acetate (Copaxone) has been combined with mitoxantrone in such a way that every course of mitoxantrone is followed by GA treatment. It has yielded promising results twice, in a consistent way.
- natalizumab and glatiramer acetate: This combination has been found to be safe and well tolerated after six months.
- Mitoxantrone and beta-interferon: This combination has worked in some cases but not in others
- Beta-interferon and glatiramer acetate: In Phase III, with good results published
- Interferon beta 1a and natalizumab: Dangerous but effective. Linked with PML, but is remarkable that Natalizumab alone is also linked with it.
- Natalizumab and fingolimod. No formal research has been done, but some problems have been reported.
- Interferon beta 1a and glatimer acetate: No additional benefits found
- Alemtuzumab and glatiramer acetate: A combination trial of alemtuzumab with glatiramer acetate (Copaxone) is being considered, and is expected to work synergistically.
- laquinimod and fampridine, with good results, subject to patent where applicable
- Mitoxantrone and rituximab: Human anti-chimeric antibodies (HACA) appear in patients treated with Rituximab. MTX reduces them. A safety analysis of RA patients treated with rituximab in combination with MTX in clinical trials showed that 11% of patients developed a positive titer for HACA's at least once during treatment with rituximab.
- Laquinimod and dimethyl fumarate: (Patented by Teva Pharmaceutical Industries Ltd): It has been tested and looks promising.

=== Approved and experimental drugs combined ===
- Glatiramer acetate and minocycline. Good results
- Avonex and atorvastatin: Avonex (beta-1a) has also been combined with atorvastatin in a clinical trial showing that is safe in its conditions, even though high-dose statins are expected to produce liver problems and muscle-wasting disease over the long-term. Other clinical trials have found problems combining IFN beta with Atorvastatin
- interferon beta-1b and atorvastatin: Betaseron (beta-1b) has also been combined with atorvastatin with good safety results but poor performance. The combined treatment did not have any beneficial effects on RRMS compared to IFNB-1b monotherapy.
- Cyclophosphamide and Beta-Interferon has been tried on IFNbeta-unresponsive patients with success, but it is still under study.
- Avonex and inosine: Avonex (interferon beta-1a) was combined with inosine. Available data suggests that this combination is safe and well tolerated, though with no improvements respect interferon beta alone. The lack of additional benefits respect Avonex have been confirmed, and it has been reported that 2gr/day should be considered as the maximum safe dosage.
- Avonex and lipoic acid: Lipoic Acid is another common antioxidant
- siponimod and laquinimod: Patent pending
- ponesimod and dimethyl fumarate (Tecfidera): Under study

=== Summary table ===
Summarizing in a table which combinations have been tried:

	Interferon beta-1a	Interferon beta-1b (Betaseron)	Glatiramer acetate (Copaxone)	Mitoxantrone	Natalizumab (Tysabri)	Fingolimod (Gilenya)	Teriflunomide (Aubagio)	Dimethyl fumarate BG12 (Tecfidera)	Alemtuzumab (Lemtrada)
Interferon beta-1a	—	—	—	—	—	—	—	—	—
Interferon beta-1b (Betaseron)	NO	—	—	—	—	—	—	—	—
Glatiramer acetate (Copaxone)	YES	NO	—	—	—	—	—	—	—
Mitoxantrone	NO	NO	YES	—	—	—	—	—	—
Natalizumab (Tysabri)	YES (linked to PML)	NO	YES	NO	—	—	—	—	—
Fingolimod (Gilenya)	NO	NO	NO	NO	NO	—	—	—	—
Teriflunomide (Aubagio)	NO	NO	NO	NO	NO	NO	—	—	—
Dymetyl fumarate BG12 (Tecfidera)	NO	NO	NO	NO	NO	NO	NO	—	—
Alemtuzumab (Lemtrada)	NO	NO	NO	NO	NO	NO	NO	NO	—
Atorvastatin (Lipitor)	YES	YES	NO	NO	NO	NO	NO	NO	NO
Cyclophosphamide	NO	YES	NO	NO	NO	NO	NO	NO	NO
Inosine	YES	NO	NO	NO	NO	NO	NO	NO	NO

== Biomarkers for the expected response ==
Personalized treatment or theranostics in MS is an active field or research that is trying to predict the response to the different known medications.

=== Interferons ===
Beta-interferons are contraindicated in cases of anti-AQP4 or anti-MOG seropositivity. Interferon injections can induce neutralising antibodies against them, turning the medication ineffective. IFN-β 1b is more immunogenic than IFN-β 1a, and the subcutaneous administration has a higher risk than the intramuscular administration Both interferons should induce MxA (myxovirus protein A) mRNA, being its absence a negative indicator

There is heterogeneity in the immunologic pathways even restricted to RRMS population, and it correlates with IFN-β response. In a small study patients were clustered into 6 distinct subsets by baseline cytokine profiles. Two subsets were associated with patients who responded poorly to therapy. Two other subsets showed a significant reduction in relapse rates and no worsening of disability.

=== Glatimer acetate ===
For glatimer acetate, the biomarkers for response are interleukins. IL-27 is a biomarker for response, and IL-18 and IL-4 are also possible good biomarkers

It also seems that phosphorylated SIRT1 expression in mRNA is also a biomarker for response.

=== Mitoxantrone ===
The best predictive biomarker for mitoxantrone available is the number of relapses in separate areas within the past 24 months before treatment.

=== Natalizumab ===
Natalizumab can also induce neutralising antibodies 4 to 6 months after treatment initiation. Fetuin-A (alpha-2-HS-glycoprotein) and circulating CD49 expression are emerging biomarkers for the therapeutic efficacy of natalizumab.

=== Fingolimod ===
Lymphocyte subpopulations in peripheral blood is a promising tool to select RRMS candidate for fingolimod treatment.

=== Rituximab and anti-CD20 ===
Gadolinium enhancement before treatment initiation as a predictor of anti-CD20 response in MS.
