= Research in multiple sclerosis =

Research in multiple sclerosis may find new pathways to interact with the disease, improve function, curtail attacks, or limit the progression of the underlying disease. Many treatments already in clinical trials involve drugs that are used in other diseases or medications that have not been designed specifically for multiple sclerosis. There are also trials involving the combination of drugs that are already in use for multiple sclerosis. Finally, there are also many basic investigations that try to understand the disease better and in the future may help to find new treatments.

Research directions on MS treatments include investigations of MS pathogenesis and heterogeneity; research of more effective, convenient, or tolerable new treatments for RRMS; creation of therapies for the progressive subtypes; neuroprotection strategies; and the search for effective symptomatic treatments.

== Separated variants ==
Several previous MS variants have been recently separated from MS after the discovery of a specific auto-antibody, specially autoantibodies against AQP4, MOG and Neurofascin proteins.

Previously recognized variants of MS like Optic-Spinal MS is now classified as a phenotype of the anti-AQP4 spectrum, and some tumefactive cases of MS as anti-MOG associated encephalomyelitis. Some researchers think that there could exist also an overlapping between Anti-NMDA receptor encephalitis cases and neuromyelitis optica or acute disseminated encephalomyelitis.

The following previous MS variants are now considered apart from MS:

- Optic-Spinal MS: Now it is considered inside the Anti-AQP4 diseases spectrum.
- Anti-MOG associated MS and some cases of tumefactive multiple sclerosis currently considered inside the anti-MOG spectrum.
- Anti-neurofascin associated MS and CIDP: Some Anti-neurofascin demyelinating diseases were previously considered a subtype of Multiple Sclerosis but now they are considered a separate entity, as it happened before to anti-MOG and anti-AQP4 cases. Around 10% of MS cases are now thought to be anti-Neurofascin disease in reality. Anti-neurofascin autoantibodies have been reported in atypical cases of MS and CIDP, and a whole spectrum of Anti-neurofascin demyelinating diseases has been proposed. Some cases of CIDP are reported to be produced by auto-antibodies against several neurofascin proteins. These proteins are present in the neurons and four of them have been reported to produce disease: NF186, NF180, NF166 and NF155. Antibodies against Neurofascins NF-155 can also appear in MS and NF-186 could be involved in subtypes of MS yielding an intersection between both conditions. Summarising, autoantibodies against several neurofascins can produce MS: neurofascin186 (NF186), neurofascin155 (NF155), contactin 1 (CNTN1), contactin associated protein 1 (CASPR1) and gliomedin. All of them nodal and paranodal proteins.
- Anti-TNF associated MS: Several anti-TNF drugs like adalimumab are commonly prescribed by a number of autoimmune conditions. Some of them have been reported to produce a CNS-demyelination compatible with, and by current knowledge indistinguishable from, standard MS. Several other monoclonal antibodies like pembrolizumab, nivolumab and infliximab have been also reported to produce MS artificially. This has given birth to the Anti-TNF-α therapy-associated demyelinating disorders. The reactions have been diverse according to the source of the disease. Some of these cases can be classify as ADEM, using the confluent demyelination as barrier between both conditions. In most cases, the damage fulfills all pathological diagnostic criteria of MS and can therefore be classified as MS in its own right. The lesions were classified as pattern II in the Lassman/Lucchinetti system. Some lesions also showed Dawson fingers, which is supposed to be a MS-only feature.
- LHON-associated MS: Also a previous subtype of MS associated to LHON has been described (LHON-MS). It is a presentation of LHON with MS-like CNS damage. It used to satisfy McDonalds definition for MS, but after demonstration that LHON can produce this kind of lesions, the "no better explanation" requirement does not hold anymore. It is not due to auto-antibodies, but to defective mitochondria instead. The symptoms of this higher form of the disease include loss of the brain's ability to control the movement of muscles, tremors, and cardiac arrhythmia. and the lack of muscular control.

== Treatments ==
Advancements during the last decades have led to the recent approval of several oral drugs. In March 2019 for example the Food and Drug Administration approved cladribine tablets (Mavenclad) to treat relapsing forms of multiple sclerosis (MS) in adults, to include relapsing-remitting disease and active secondary progressive disease. These drugs are expected to gain in popularity and frequency of use at the expense of previously existing therapies.

Further oral drugs are still under investigation, the most notable example being laquinimod, which was announced in August 2012 to be the focus of a third phase III trial after mixed results in the previous ones. Early trials of the female sex hormone estriol, led in part by Rhonda Voskuhl, have generated interest in reducing symptoms in women with RRMS. Similarly, several other studies are aimed to improve efficacy and ease of use of already existing therapies through the use of novel preparations.

Such is the case the PEGylated version of interferon-β-1a, that has a longer life than normal interferon and therefore it is being studied if given at less frequent doses has a similar efficacy than the existing product. Peginterferon beta-1a was approved for use in the United States in August 2014.

Preliminary data have suggested that mycophenolate mofetil, an anti-rejection immunosuppressant medication, might have benefits in people with multiple sclerosis. However, a systematic review found that the limited evidence available was insufficient to determine the effects of mycophenolate mofetil as an add‐on therapy for interferon beta-1a in people with RRMS.

Monoclonal antibodies, which are biological drugs of the same family as natalizumab, have also raised high levels of interest and research. Alemtuzumab, daclizumab and CD20 monoclonal antibodies such as rituximab, ocrelizumab and ofatumumab have all shown some benefit and are under study as potential treatments for MS. Nevertheless, their use has also been accompanied by the appearance of potentially dangerous adverse effects, most importantly opportunistic infections. Related to these investigations is the recent development of a test against JC virus antibodies which might help to predict what patients are at a greater risk of developing progressive multifocal leukoencephalopathy when taking natalizumab. While monoclonal antibodies are probably going to have some role in the treatment of the disease in the future, it is believed that it will be small due to the risks associated to them.

Another research strategy is to evaluate the combined effectiveness of two or more drugs. The main rationale for polytherapy in MS is that the involved treatments target different mechanisms of the disease and therefore, their use is not necessarily exclusive. Moreover, synergies, in which a drug potentiates the effect of another, are also possible. Nevertheless, there can also appear important drawbacks such as antagonizing mechanisms of action or potentiation of deleterious secondary effects. While there have been several clinical trials of combined therapy none has shown positive enough effects to merit the consideration as a viable treatment for MS.

Regarding neuroprotective and regenerative treatments such as stem cell therapy, while their research is considered of high importance at the moment they are only a promise of future therapeutic approaches. Likewise, there are not any effective treatments for the progressive variants of the disease. Many of the newest drugs as well as those under development are probably going to be evaluated as therapies for PPMS or SPMS, and their improved effectiveness when compared with previously existing drugs may eventually lead to a positive result in these groups of patients.

=== Disease-modifying drugs ===
Disease-modifying drugs represent possible interventions able to modify the natural course of the disease instead of targeting the symptoms or the recovery from relapses. Over a dozen clinical trials testing potential therapies are underway, and additional new treatments are being devised and tested in animal models.

New drugs must pass several clinical trials in order to get approved by regulatory agencies. Phase III is normally the last testing phase and when results are as expected a formal approval request is submitted to the regulator. Phase III programs consist of studies on large patient groups (300 to 3,000 or more) and are aimed at being the definitive assessment of how effective and safe a test drug will be. It is the last stage of drug development and is followed by a submission to the appropriate regulatory agencies (e.g., European Medicines Agency (EMEA) for the European Union, the Food and Drug Administration (FDA) for the United States, Therapeutic Goods Administration (TGA) for Australia, etc.) to obtain approval for marketing. Treatment in MS phase III studies is usually two years per patient.

=== Relapsing-remitting MS ===
Currently there are several ongoing phase III trials, and there are also some drugs that are waiting for approval after finishing theirs. The following drugs, at least, are also in phase III (for a complete list see Multiple sclerosis drug pipeline):

- Tovaxin (injectable) A vaccine against self T-Cells, which consist of attenuated autoreactive T cells. It is developed by Opexa Therapeutics, (previously known as PharmaFrontiers), and finished a phase IIb September 2008, failing its primary target though in March 2008 was still performing well. After several financial troubles, a phase III trial was granted in 2011.

=== Secondary progressive variants ===
Relapsing-Onset variants (RO), even when they turn into progressive, have proved easier to treat than Progressive-Onset variants. Though difficult to treat, Secondary progressive and Progressive-Relapsing are easier to treat than PPMS. Only mitoxantrone has been approved for them, but there is nothing for PPMS. At this moment several therapies are under research:

- Cyclophosphamide (trade name Revimmune) is currently in Phase III for secondary progressive MS. It was also studied for RRMS but the company does not pursue actively this path. After a 2006 study for refractory cases it showed good behaviour Later, a 2007 open label study found it equivalent to mitoxantrone and in 2008 evidence appeared that it can reverse disability.
- Simvastatin has shown brain atrophy reduction in secondary progressive MS.
- Masitinib, a tyrosine kinase inhibitor, is in late-stage testing for the treatment of patients with secondary and primary progressive MS (PPMS). It is a twice-daily oral medication that targets mast cells and inhibits several biochemical processes.14
- Ibudilast: MediciNova, Inc., announced that MN-166 (ibudilast) has been approved for "fast track" development by the U.S. Food and Drug Administration (FDA) as of 2016, as a potential treatment for progressive multiple sclerosis (MS). Progressive MS in this case means both the primary progressive (PPMS) and secondary progressive (SPMS) forms of the disease.

=== Treatment for Primary Progressive variants ===
Most Progressive-Onset variants do not have any approved disease-modifying treatment currently. Some possible treatments have been published, such as methylprednisolone pulses or riluzole, and some reduction of spasticity was reported in a pilot Italian study on low dose naltrexone but there is nothing conclusive still.

Currently, good results using the monoclonal antibody ocrelizumab in primary progressive MS (PPMS) have put the focus into depleting B cells targeting CD20 proteins

A statin, simvastatin (Zocor), has shown good results in progressive variants Also masitinib and ibudilast, mainly targeted to SPMS have recruited PPMS patients in their clinical trials with good results.

Respect the etiological research, a special genetic variant named rapidly progressive multiple sclerosis has been described. It is due to a mutation inside the gene NR1H3, an arginine to glutamine mutation in the position p.Arg415Gln, in an area that codifies the protein LXRA.

=== Highly active relapsing remitting variant ===
Highly Active Relapsing Remitting, sometimes called Rapidly Worsening relapsing remitting, is a clinical form considered distinct from standard RRMS during clinical trials, being normally non responsive to standard medication.

As of 2011, fingolimod has been approved as the first disease modifying therapy for this clinical course. Cyclophosphamide is currently used off-label for Rapidly Worsening MS (RWMS).

=== Pediatric MS ===
Pediatric patients constitute a particularly interesting MS population since the clinical onset of the disease is likely very close to the biological one. Therefore, this population offers the possibility of studying the MS pathogenesis closer to its root. Grey matter lesions were observed in the cerebellum of almost all (93.3%) adolescents with pedMS and significantly outnumbered WML, suggesting that the cerebellar cortex is a main target of MS-related pathology in teens.

A former problem with pediatric patients is that some variants of anti-MOG disease were considered MS before 2016. Therefore, publications before this date have to be considered with caution. Currently the only approved treatment for pediatric MS is fingolimod.

== Personalized medicine ==
Personalized medicine refers to the expected possibility of classifying patients as good or bad responders before starting a therapy. Given the side effects of all MS medications, this is currently an active field of research.

=== Biomarkers ===
Several biomarkers for diagnosis, disease evolution and response to medication (current or expected) are under research. While most of them are still under research, there are some of them already well established:

- oligoclonal bands: They present proteins that are in the CNS or in blood. Those that are in CNS but not in blood suggest a diagnosis of MS.
- MRZ-Reaction: A polyspecific antiviral immune response against the viruses of measles, rubella and zoster found in 1992. In some reports the MRZR showed a lower sensitivity than OCB (70% vs. 100%), but a higher specificity (69% vs. 92%) for MS.
- free light chains (FLC). Several authors have reported that they are comparable or even better than oligoclonal bands.

=== Imaging ===
While MRI is used normally for diagnosis and follow up, it has limitations. New MRI technologies like pulse sequences and post-processing are under study.

Some of the features of MS, like microglia activation, are invisible to MRI. Therefore positron emission tomography (PET) is preferred in the current studies.

Patients with multiple sclerosis (MS) routinely undergo serial contrast-enhanced MRI checks. Given concerns regarding tissue deposition of gadolinium-based contrast agents (GBCAs) and evidence that enhancement of lesions is only seen in patients with new disease activity on noncontrast imaging, research is now being carried out to understand and implement what intravenous contrast agents would be reserved for patients with evidence of new disease activity on non-contrast images.

=== Clinical measures of evolution ===
The main measure of evolution of symptoms, specially important as an endpoint in MS trials, is the EDSS (extended disability status score). However, this and other measures used in clinical studies are far from perfect and suffer from insensitivity or inadequate validation. In this sense there is ongoing research to improve the EDSS and other measures such as the multiple sclerosis functional composite. This is important as the greater efficacy of existing medications force functional measures in clinical trials to be highly sensitive in order to adequately measure disease changes.

Currently there are two main criteria coexisting:

- EDSS (disability status scale), the first scale to monitor MS progression.
- NEDA (No evidence of disease activity), the new one.

Several NEDA criteria have been published. NEDA-3 means that EDSS remains constant, MRI shows no activity and no relapses have appeared. NEDA-4 means NEDA-3 plus that brain atrophy has not increased. Some authors speak about a NEDA-3+ which is a NEDA-3 plus no cortical lesions.

== Clinical courses redefinition ==
In MS usually the clinical course is referred to as "type", while radiological and pathological types are referred to as "variants".

=== Lublin classification ===
In 1996, the US National Multiple Sclerosis Society (NMSS) Advisory Committee on Clinical Trials in Multiple Sclerosis (ACCTMS) standardized four clinical courses for MS (Remitent-Recidivant, Secondary Progressive, Progressive-Relapsing and Primary progressive). Later, these were considered subtypes of the disease and this is known as the Lublin classification.

Some reports state that those "types" were artificially made up for classifying RRMS as a separate disease. In this way, the number of patients in this group was low enough to get the interferon approved by the FDA under the orphan drugs act.

Later revisions of this report removed the progressive-relapsing course and added CIS. Nevertheless, regulatory agencies often refer to unofficial subtypes in their recommendations, like "active SPMS" "highly active", or "rapidly progressive".

These types have proven to be unspecific. In the days in which NMO was considered a kind of MS (optic-spinal MS), the four clinical types model on widespread usage, and it was nevertheless unable to yield any clue about all the important differences.

Currently it is accepted that the "types" are not exclusive. The standard course of the disease presents three different clinical stages. A preclinical or prodromal stage, also termed RIS (radiologically isolated sindrome), a relapsing stage and finally a progressive stage.

=== Atypical clinical courses ===
In 1996, the US National Multiple Sclerosis Society (NMSS) Advisory Committee on Clinical Trials in Multiple Sclerosis (ACCTMS) standardized four clinical courses for MS (remittent-recidivant, secondary progressive, progressive-relapsing and primary progressive).

Some reports state that those "types" were artificially made up trying to classify RRMS as a separate disease so that the number of patients was low enough to get the interferon approved by the FDA under the orphan drugs act. Revisions in 2013 and 2017 removed the Progressive-Relapsing course and introduced CIS as a variety/course/status of MS, stabilising the actual classification (CIS, RRMS, SPMS and PPMS). Nevertheless, these types are not enough to predict the responses to medications and several regulatory agencies use additional types in their recommendations, such as highly active MS, malignant MS, aggressive MS or rapidly progressive MS.

== Research into pathogenesis ==
Research into pathogenesis focuses on explaining the fundamental causation of MS onset and progression, and explaining its heterogeneous behaviour. There are several open lines of research as to the cause of MS, ranging from metabolic disregulation to infection.

Regarding the possibility of a viral cause, there are reports of monoclonal antibodies against Epstein–Barr virus–infected B-cells. These reports have been recently complemented by reported interactions between Epstein–Barr virus (EBV) and human endogenous retroviruses (HERVs), and experiments in vitro showing how HERVs can activate microglia into an active state that produces demyelination. A longitudinal study showed the risk of MS increased 32-fold after infection with EBV, suggesting EBV is a primary cause of MS, although only a very small proportion of those infected with EBV will later develop MS.

Pathological research tries to obtain correlations for the observable biomarkers. Several important areas of study have been delimited, such as Normal Appearing White Matter areas, which are the source of the lesions and under special MRI techniques like magnetic resonance spectroscopy have been found to have a similar molecular composition.

Also some external agents can modify the disease course. Smoking is known to modify (for worse) the course of the disease, and recently this effect has been seen via MRI. An explanation of this effect could shed some light into the pathogenesis.

=== Geographical causes ===
Extensive research on multiple sclerosis is being done on what parts of the world have higher rates of MS compared to other regions. Researchers have studied MS mortality statistics in various latitudes of the earth and the pattern shows that MS mortality rates are lowest in equatorial regions, which contain the countries Ethiopia and Jamaica. It increases towards the north and south showing that the highest MS rate is at a latitude of around 60 degrees, which are the countries Orkney, Shetland Islands, and Oslo, Norway. The next step for researchers would be to consider what factors are different at the latitudes of 60 degrees and the equatorial regions and continue to narrow down their theories for the exact cause of MS.

=== Heterogeneity ===
Another important research field in MS is over its heterogeneity. There are also some reports considering that several disease entities are confused into the same clinical entity "multiple sclerosis". For example, neuromyelitis optica, formerly considered a kind of MS, was separated in 2006 with the discovery of AQP4-IgG, and currently a second variant has been separated, antiMOG associated encephalomyelitis and a third one was separated as anti-neurofascin disease.

This research is not closed and some other conditions could be separated from MS following the discovery of specific pathogens.

MS has been historically a clinically defined entity including several atypical presentations. Some auto-antibodies have been found in atypical MS cases, giving birth to separate disease families and restricting the previously wider concept of MS.

The research in MS heterogeneity is trying to set apart all the pathogenically unrelated conditions that are currently included in the spectrum. It is an ongoing research and the list of separated conditions could grow in the future.

First of all, anti-AQP4 autoantibodies were found in neuromyelitis optica (NMO), which was previously considered a MS variant. After that, a whole spectrum of diseases named NMO spectrum diseases (NMOSD) or anti-AQP4 diseases has been accepted.

Later, it was found that some cases of MS were presenting anti-MOG autoantibodies, mainly overlapping with the Marburg variant. Anti-MOG autoantibodies were found to be also present in ADEM, and now a second spectrum of separated diseases is being considered. At this moment, it is named inconsistently across different authors, but it is normally something similar to anti-MOG demyelinating diseases.

Finally, a third kind of auto-antibodies is accepted. They are several anti-neurofascin auto-antibodies which damage the Ranvier nodes of the neurones. These antibodies are more related to the peripheral nervous demyelination, but they were also found in chronic progressive PPMS and combined central and peripheral demyelination (CCPD, which is considered another atypical MS presentation).

Other auto-antigens are under study, such as GDP-L-fucose synthase which is reported in a subset of MS patients. It is currently unknown if it is pathogenic or a side effect of the disease.

Other example could be a new kind of multiple sclerosis without white matter demyelination that affects 12% of the patients and could behave differently from the rest of patients. Later its existence was confirmed (2018)

Besides all this autoantibodies found, four different patterns of demyelination have been reported in MS, opening the door to consider MS as an heterogeneous disease.

=== Viruses ===
Epstein–Barr virus has been the focus of heavy research. A cross-reactivity between GlialCam and EBNA1 has been reported on 25% of MS cases

Human endogenous retroviruses (HERVs) have been reported in MS for several years. In fact, one of the families, human endogenous retrovirus-W, was first discovered while studying MS patients.

Recent research as of 2019 point to one of the HERV-W viruses (pHEV-W), and specifically one of the proteins of the viral capside that has been found to activate microglia in vitro. Activated microglia in turn produces demyelination. Some interactions between the Epstein–Barr virus and the HERVs could be the trigger of the MS microglia reactions. Supporting this study, a monoclonal antibody against the viral capside (Temelimab) has shown good results in trials in phase IIb.

=== Genetics ===
Advances in genetic testing techniques have led to a greater understanding of the genetics of MS. However, it is hard to predict how these future discoveries will impact clinical practice or research for new drugs and treatments.

An example of a soon-to-be finished study is the Wellcome Trust Case Control Consortium, a collaboration study including 120,000 genetic samples, of which 8000 are from individuals with MS. This study may presumably identify all the common genetic variants involved in MS. Further studies will probably involve full genome sequencing of large samples, or the study of structural genetic variants such as insertions, deletions or polymorphisms.

Genetic factors are the primary cause to the more rapid progression and frequency of the disease. Although genetics is linked to multiple sclerosis, most of the prime perceptivity of the linkage has not been fully characterized as there has not been a big enough sample size available for the research needed. Some genetic mutations have been associated with an increased risk to develop MS, like STK11-SNP. The chronic demyelination may cause axons to be notably vulnerable to repetitive and increasing injury and destruction.

== Progressive variants ==
Cortical atrophy and demyelination along the subpial surface appear early in the disease course but accelerate in progressive stage. Inflammatory infiltrates appear in the meninges, in some cases with B cell follicles. Leptomeningeal enhancement under MRI is common in patients with progressive forms of MS and shows a relationship to subpial cortical lesions and cortical atrophy.
