= Management of multiple sclerosis =

Approaches to managing the disease

Multiple sclerosis (MS) is a chronic inflammatory demyelinating disease that affects the central nervous system (CNS). Several therapies for it exist, although there is no known cure.

The most common initial course of the disease is the relapsing-remitting subtype, which is characterized by unpredictable attacks (relapses) followed by periods of relative remission with no new signs of disease activity. After some years, many of the people who have this subtype begin to experience neurologic decline without acute relapses. When this happens it is called secondary progressive multiple sclerosis. Other, less common, courses of the disease are the primary progressive (decline from the beginning without attacks) and the progressive-relapsing (steady neurologic decline and superimposed attacks). Different therapies are used for patients experiencing acute attacks, for patients who have the relapsing-remitting subtype, for patients who have the progressive subtypes, for patients without a diagnosis of MS who have a demyelinating event, and for managing the various consequences of MS.

The primary aims of therapy are returning function after an attack, preventing new attacks, and preventing disability. As with any medical treatment, medications used in the management of MS may have several adverse effects, and many possible therapies are still under investigation. At the same time different alternative treatments are pursued by many people, despite the fact that there is little supporting, comparable, replicated scientific study. Stem cell therapy is being studied.

This article focuses on therapies for standard MS; borderline forms of MS have particular treatments that are excluded.

== Acute attacks ==
Chemical structure of methylprednisolone. Corticosteroids are used during acute multiple sclerosis relapses.

Administration of high doses of intravenous corticosteroids, such as methylprednisolone, is the routine therapy for acute relapses. This is administered over a period of three to five days, and has a well-established efficacy in promoting a faster recovery from disability after an attack. There is however insufficient evidence to indicate any significant impact on long-term disability of corticosteroid treatments. Steroids administered orally have a similar effectiveness and safety profile at treating MS symptoms as intravenous treatment. Consequences of severe attacks which do not respond to corticosteroids might be treated by plasmapheresis.

High dosage intravenous corticosteroids or plasmapheresis, designated for individuals not responding to steroids, make up the majority of acute management; Symptomatic management: Individuals with multiple sclerosis (MS) experience a range of symptoms, such as cognitive decline, discomfort, exhaustion, urinary problems, and stiffness. Both pharmaceutical and non-pharmacological approaches are used to address these symptoms. The management of MS symptoms requires a comprehensive and interdisciplinary approach from patients; illness-modifying therapies (DMTs): These medications act as moderators of illness, lowering the risk of relapses and slowing the disease's course.

== Disease-modifying treatments ==
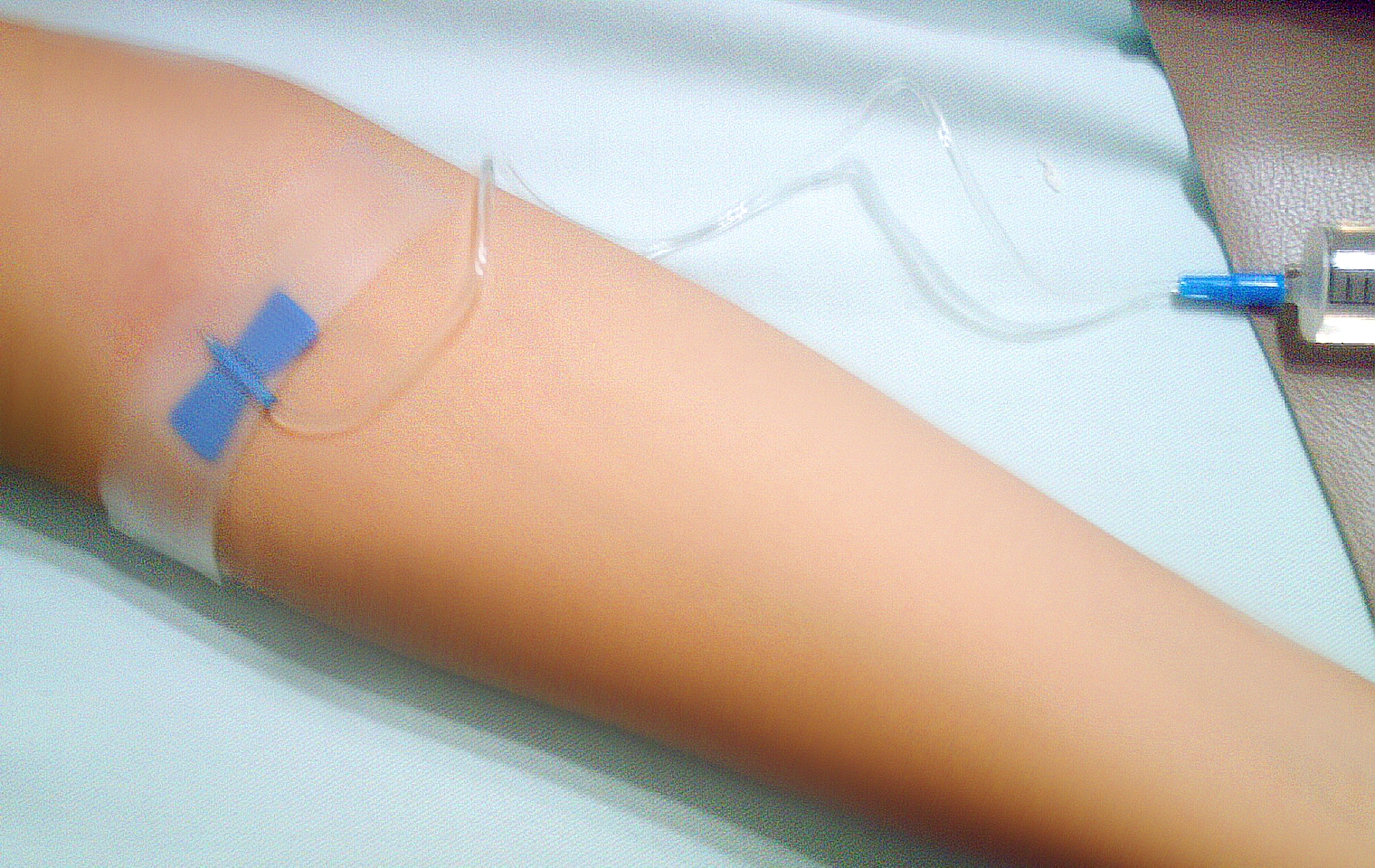
Disease-modifying treatments are expensive and most require frequent (up-to-daily) injections, under the skin or into the muscle. Newer treatments feature intravenous (IV) infusions (shown above) at 1 to 3-month intervals.

As of 2020, several disease-modifying treatments have been approved by regulatory agencies of different countries, including the US Food and Drug Administration (FDA), the European Medicines Agency (EMA) and the Pharmaceuticals and Medical Devices Agency (PMDA) of the Japanese Ministry of Health, Labour and Welfare.

Medications approved by the FDA include: interferons beta-1a and beta-1b; monoclonal antibodies: natalizumab, alemtuzumab, ocrelizumab, ofatumumab, and ublituximab; and immunomodulators: glatiramer acetate, mitoxantrone, fingolimod, teriflunomide, dimethyl fumarate, and diroximel fumarate. Siponimod was approved in March 2019. Cladribine was approved in March 2019. Ozanimod was approved in March 2020.

Daclizumab, that was once approved, was later withdrawn.

=== Medications ===
In 1993, interferon beta-1b was the first drug to ever be approved for MS, being soon followed by interferon beta-1a and glatiramer acetate.

Interferon beta-1a is injected either weekly (intramuscular injection) or three times a week (subcutaneous injection) depending on commercial formulations, while interferon beta-1b is injected subcutaneously every second day. In 2014, a pegylated form of interferon beta-1a was introduced with the brand name Plegridy, which is available as a subcutaneous injection. This peginterferon beta 1-a attaches polyethylene glycol to the interferon molecules allowing longer lasting biological effects in the body while decreasing the frequency of administration to once every two weeks. Interferon beta balances the expression of pro- and anti-inflammatory agents in the brain, and reduces the number of inflammatory cells that cross the blood–brain barrier. Overall, therapy with interferon beta leads to a reduction of neuron inflammation. Moreover, it is also thought to increase the production of nerve growth factor and consequently improve neuronal survival.

Glatiramer acetate is a mixture of random polymers of four amino acids which is antigenically similar to the myelin basic protein, a component of the myelin sheath of nerves with which it competes for presentation to T cells . It is injected subcutaneously on a daily basis.

Mitoxantrone is an immunosuppressant also used in cancer chemotherapy which was approved for MS in the year 2000; whereas natalizumab is a monoclonal antibody that was initially approved in 2004. Both are given by intravenous infusion at monthly intervals in the case of natalizumab and every three months in the case of mitoxantrone.

In 2010, fingolimod, a sphingosine-1-phosphate receptor modulator, became the first oral drug approved by the FDA, being followed in 2012 by teriflunomide, a drug that inhibits the synthesis of pyrimidine and disrupts the interaction of T cells with antigen presenting cell. Fingolimod and teriflunomide are taken through a daily single dose. In 2013 one further oral drug, dimethyl fumarate -or BG12- (which is an improved version of fumaric acid, an already existing drug), was approved by the FDA.

Another oral drug, cladribine, was approved in Russia and Australia in 2010. Its application was rejected by the FDA and EMEA in 2011, due to safety concerns. This led the pharmaceutical to discontinue commercialization and withdraw all marketing applications.

In March 2017, ocrelizumab was approved in the United States for the treatment of primary progressive multiple sclerosis in adults. It is also used in adults for the treatment of relapsing forms of multiple sclerosis, to include clinically isolated syndrome, relapsing-remitting disease, and active secondary progressive disease. Ocrelizumab was approved for use in the European Union in January 2018.

In 2019, siponimod and cladribine were approved in the United States for the treatment of secondary progressive multiple sclerosis. Siponimod was approved for use in the European Union in January 2020, for the treatment of adults with secondary progressive multiple sclerosis. Cladribine was approved for use in the European Union in August 2017, for the treatment of adults with relapsing forms of multiple sclerosis.

In October 2019, diroximel fumarate (Vumerity) was approved for medical use in the United States.

In March 2020, ozanimod (Zeposia) was approved in the United States for the treatment of relapsing multiple sclerosis, to include clinically isolated syndrome, relapsing-remitting disease, and active secondary progressive disease, in adults.

In April 2020, monomethyl fumarate (Bafiertam) was approved in the United States for the treatment of relapsing forms of multiple sclerosis, to include clinically isolated syndrome, relapsing-remitting disease, and active secondary progressive disease, in adults.

Ponesimod (Ponvory) was approved for medical use in the United States in March 2021.

Ublituximab (Briumvi) was approved for medical use in the United States in December 2022.

==== Side effects ====
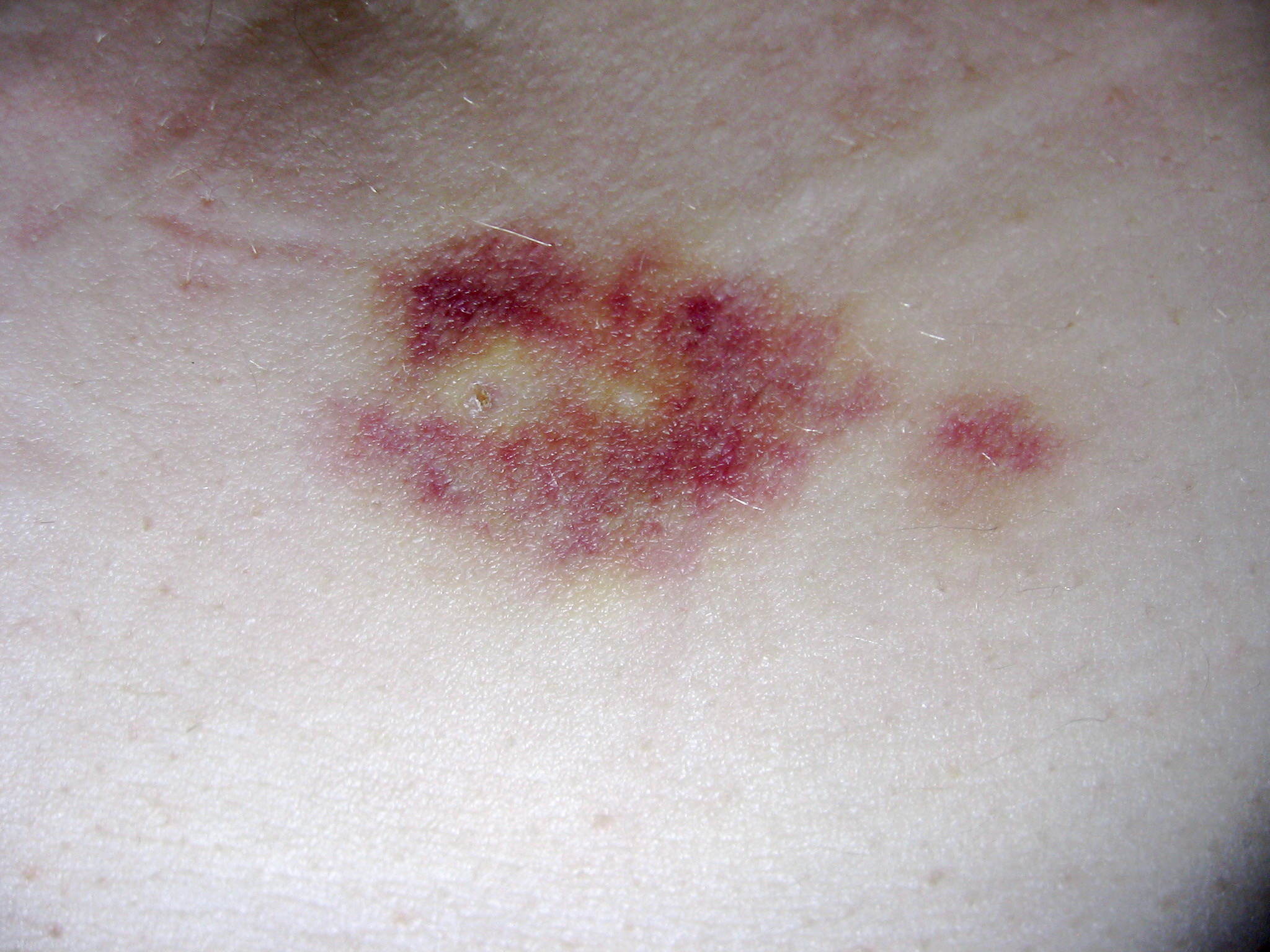
Injectable medications can produce irritation or bruises at injection site. The bruise depicted was produced by a subcutaneous injection.

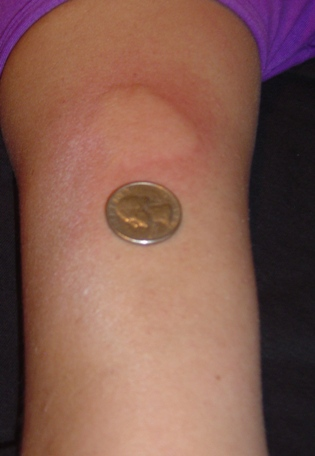
Irritation zone after injection of glatiramer acetate.

Both the interferons and glatiramer acetate are available only in injectable forms, and both can cause skin reactions at the injection site, specially with subcutaneous administration. Skin reactions vary greatly in their clinical presentation and may include bruising, erythema, pain, pruritus, irritation, swelling and in the most extreme cases cutaneous necrosis. They usually appear within the first month of treatment albeit their frequence and importance diminish after six months of use. Mild skin reactions usually do not impede treatment whereas necroses appear in around 5% of patients and lead to the discontinuation of the therapy. Also over time, a visible dent at the injection site due to the local destruction of fat tissue, known as lipoatrophy, may develop.

Interferons, a subclass of cytokines, are produced in the body during illnesses such as influenza in order to help fight the infection. They are responsible of many of the symptoms of influenza infections, including fever, muscle aches, fatigue, and headaches. Many patients report influenza-like symptoms hours after taking interferon-beta that usually improve within 24 hours, being such symptoms related to the temporary increase of cytokines. This reaction tends to disappear after 3 months of treatment and its symptoms can be treated with over-the-counter nonsteroidal anti-inflammatory drugs, such as ibuprofen, that reduce fever and pain. Another common transient secondary effect with interferon-beta is a functional deterioration of already existing symptoms of the disease. Such deterioration is similar to the one produced in MS patients due to heat, fever or stress (Uhthoff's phenomenon), usually appears within 24 hours of treatment, is more common in the initial months of treatment, and may last several days. A symptom specially sensitive to worsening is spasticity. Interferon-beta can also reduce numbers of white blood cells (leukopenia), lymphocytes (lymphopenia) and neutrophils (neutropenia), as well as affect liver function. In most cases these effects are non-dangerous and reversible after cessation or reduction of treatment. Nevertheless, recommendation is that all patients should be monitored through laboratory blood analyses, including liver function tests, to ensure safe use of interferons.

Glatiramer acetate is generally well tolerated. The most common secondary effect with glatiramer acetate after skin problem is a post-injection reaction manifested by flushing, chest tightness, heart palpitations, breathlessness, and anxiety, which usually lasts less than thirty minutes and does not require additional treatment.

Mitoxantrone therapy may be associated with immunosuppressive effects and liver damage; however its most dangerous side effect is its dose-related cardiac toxicity. Careful adherence to the administration and monitoring guidelines is therefore essential; this includes obtaining an echocardiogram and a complete blood count before treatment to decide whether the therapy is suitable for the patient or the risks are too great. It is recommended that mitoxantrone be discontinued at the first signs of heart damage, infection or liver dysfunction during therapy. Heart problems (mainly systolic dysfunction) appear in over 10% of patients, while leukemia prevalence is 0.8%.

Soon after its approval natalizumab was withdrawn from the market by its manufacturer after it was linked with three cases of the rare but hazardous neurological condition called progressive multifocal leukoencephalopathy (PML). PML is an opportunistic infection with neurological progressive symptoms caused by the replication of the JC virus in the glial cells of the brain. All 3 initial cases were taking natalizumab in combination with interferon beta-1a. After a safety review the drug was returned to the market in 2006 as a monotherapy for MS under a special prescription program. As of May 2011, over 130 cases of PML had been reported, all in patients who had taken natalizumab for more than a year. While none of them had taken the drug in combination with other disease-modifying treatments, previous use of MS treatments increases the risk of PML between 3 and 4-fold. The estimated prevalence of PML is 1.5 cases per thousand natalizumab users. Around 20% of MS patients with PML die, while most of the remaining are importantly disabled.

During clinical trials fingolimod gave rise to side effects such as hypertension and bradycardia, macular edema, elevated liver enzymes or reduction in lymphocyte levels. Teriflunomide is considered a very safe drug. Nevertheless, there have been reports of liver failure, and PML. Teriflunomide is also known to be dangerous for fetal development. Most common secondary effects of dimethyl fumarate during clinical trials were flushing and gastrointestinal problems. These problems were generally mild and occurred more frequently during the first month of treatment. While dimethyl fumarate leads to a reduction in white blood cell count and levels should be monitored in patients, there were no reported cases of opportunistic infections during the clinical trials. Moreover, fumaric acid is also used to treat psoriasis, another autoinmune disorder, and there is long term safety data from over 14 years of use without any indication of further dangerous secondary effects. In a disproportionality analysis based on real-world adverse event reports (FAERS), none of the FDA approved DMTs was associated higher risk of cancer-related reported outcomes.

=== Clinically isolated syndrome ===
The earliest clinical presentation of RRMS is the clinically isolated syndrome (CIS), that is, a single attack of a single symptom. During a CIS, there is a subacute attack suggestive of demyelination but the patient does not fulfill the criteria for diagnosis of multiple sclerosis. Early treatment can reduce the hazard of conversion to from a first attack to clinically definite multiple sclerosis. However, it is difficult to make firm conclusions about the best treatment, especially regarding the long‐term benefit and safety of early treatment, given the lack of studies directly comparing disease modifying therapies or long-term monitoring of patient outcomes.

=== Relapsing-remitting MS ===
Medications are modestly effective at decreasing the number of attacks in RRMS and in reducing the accumulation of brain lesions, which is measured using gadolinium-enhanced magnetic resonance imaging (MRI). Interferons and glatiramer acetate are roughly equivalent, reducing relapses by approximately 30% and their safe profile make them the first-line treatments. Nevertheless, not all the patients are responsive to these therapies. It is known that 30% of MS patients are non-responsive to Beta interferon. One of the factors related to non-respondance is the presence of high levels of interferon beta neutralizing antibodies. Interferon therapy, and specially interferon beta-1b, induces the production of neutralizing antibodies, usually in the second 6 months of treatment, in 5 to 30% of treated patients. Moreover, a subset of RRMS patients with specially active MS, sometimes called "rapidly worsening MS" are normally non-responders to immunomodulators and are treated with either mitoxantrone or natalizumab.

Natalizumab is considered highly effective in terms of relapse rate reduction and halting disability progression, however, it is considered a second-line treatment because of the risk of adverse side-effects. Natalizumab halves the risk of relapsing when compared to interferons, having an overall efficacy of over 70%. Mitoxantrone is also highly useful to reduce attacks and disability, but it is generally not considered as a long-term therapy due to its severe cardiac toxicity.

There are no official guidelines yet on the use of disease-modifying oral treatments due to their recent development. While some believe that they will probably reduce the usage of first-line treatments the long-term safety of interferons and glatiramer acetate will probably slow this trend. It has been recommended that at the moment oral treatments should be mainly offered in those cases where patients do not use existing treatments due to needle phobia or other reasons such as perceived inefficacy of interferons and glatiramer acetate. They could also be used in patients taking natalizumab who have developed JC virus antibodies and are therefore at an increased risk of PML. Dimethyl fumarate is potentially one of the most interesting oral drugs due to the long term data from use in psoriasis which points towards a very good safety profile. A 2015 Cochrane systematic review found moderate quality evidence of a reduction in the number of people with RRMS that had relapses over a two-year treatment period with dimethyl fumarate versus placebo, as well as low quality evidence of a reduction in worsening disability, and an overall need for higher quality studies with longer follow-up.

The relative effectiveness of different treatments is unclear, as most have only been compared to placebo or a small number of other therapies. Direct comparisons of interferons and glatiramer acetate indicate similar effects or only small differences in effects on relapse rate, disease progression and magnetic resonance imaging measures. There is high confidence that natalizumab, cladribine, or alemtuzumab are decreasing relapses over a period of two years for people with RRMS. Natalizumab and interferon beta-1a (Rebif) may reduce relapses compared to both placebo and interferon beta-1a (Avonex) while Interferon beta-1b (Betaseron), glatiramer acetate, and mitoxantrone may also prevent relapses. Evidence on relative effectiveness in reducing disability progression is unclear. There is moderate confidence that a two-year treatment with natalizumab slows disability progression for people with RRMS. All medications are associated with adverse effects that may influence their risk to benefit profiles.

While more studies of the long-term effects of the drugs are needed, specially for the newest treatments, existing data on the effects of interferons and glatiramer acetate indicate that early-initiated long-term therapy is safe and it is related to better outcomes.

Oral contraceptive pills have contradictory results from different studies regarding any effect of decreasing relapse rate in women with multiple sclerosis. Certain medications for MS symptoms, such as carbamazepine (used to treat spasms and pain) and modafinil (used to treat fatigue) can make oral contraceptive pills less effective.

=== Secondary progressive MS and progressive relapsing MS ===
Chemical structure of mitoxantrone

Mitoxantrone has shown positive effects in people with a secondary progressive and progressive relapsing courses. It is moderately effective in reducing the progression of the disease and the frequency of relapses in people after two years. In 2007, it was the only medication approved in the US for both secondary progressive and progressive relapsing multiple sclerosis; however, it causes dose-dependent cardiac toxicity which limits its long-term use. It is also not approved in Europe. Natalizumab has shown efficacy and has been approved for secondary progressive MS with relapses. Studies on the use of Interferon-beta-1b in secondary progressive and progressive relapsing MS do not support that it slows progression of the disease, although it is effective in reducing the number of relapses.

=== Primary progressive MS ===
Treatment of primary progressive multiple sclerosis (PPMS) is problematic as many patients do not respond to any available therapy, and no treatment has been approved specifically for use in this form of the disease. There have been several trials investigating the efficacy of different drugs for PPMS without positive results. As of 2013, Network meta-analysis of 9 immunomodulator and immunosuppressant agents suggested that there was no evidence of any being effective in preventing disability progression in people with progressive MS. Drugs tested include interferon beta, mitoxantrone, glatiramer acetate or riluzole. People with PPMS have also been included in trials of azathioprine, methotrexate, intravenous immunoglobulin, cyclophosphamide and hematopoietic stem cell transplantation.

In March 2017, ocrelizumab was approved in the United States for the treatment of primary progressive multiple sclerosis in adults. It is also used for the treatment of relapsing forms of multiple sclerosis, to include clinically isolated syndrome, relapsing-remitting disease, and active secondary progressive disease in adults.

== Managing the effects of MS ==
=== Rehabilitation ===
==== Occupational therapy ====
Occupational Therapy can play an important factor in managing symptoms of multiple sclerosis. These symptoms are not limited to but include tremors, gait impairment, and difficulty with transfers. OT's can help manage tremors by outfitting the patient using small passive weights to decrease the intensity of the tremors. With regard to gait impairment, occupational therapists can help develop a specific gait training program, evaluate for the most appropriate adaptive equipment and devices, and consider the need for powered mobility. Occupational Therapists are skilled in transferring and can help those with multiple sclerosis with their transferring abilities as well as providing training on transferring techniques and evaluation of assistive devices.

==== Physical therapy ====
Symptoms of MS that can be improved include fatigue, spasticity, depression, bladder dysfunction, and neurological symptoms. These symptoms can be improved by physical therapy and medication. Physical therapists can show strengthening exercises and ways to stretch; ultimately making daily tasks easier and reduces fatigue while muscle strength increases as flexibility increases. Exercise therapy can be proscribed safely without increased relapse risk, and is the best supported rehabilitation intervention for reducing fatigue and improving muscle strength, mobility and quality of life according to an overview of Cochrane systematic reviews for rehabilitation. Both drug therapy and neurorehabilitation have shown to ease the burden of some symptoms, even though neither influence disease progression. For other symptoms the efficacy of treatments is still very limited.

Aquatic therapy has also been shown to alleviate symptoms of multiple sclerosis. Aquatic cycling and aerobic exercise is a safe and effective way to increase muscular strength, endurance, and circulation in MS patients. Aquatic therapy has decreased patient's pain, aided in depression/fatigue, and improved cardiorespiratory fitness. Overall, this modality has beneficial impacts on daily life activities and quality of life.

Recent evidence from a 2024 systematic review and meta-analysis of 40 randomized controlled trials further supports the role of exercise-based physical therapy in multiple sclerosis management:

exercise has been shown to improve physical function and psychological rehabilitation in people, to help reduce the risk of falls. A combination of resistance and aerobic exercise training is effective in improving balance in people with MS and supports the functional and psychological therapeutic effects through exercise. In addition, a meta-analysis showed that yoga was the best intervention to improve static and dynamic balance, and aquatic training was the best intervention to improve walking ability in people with MS. Exercise improves neurological control of muscles, increases unconscious deliberate muscle responses to dynamic joint stabilization signals, and enhances core area muscle strength to strengthen the body’s stability. (Du et al., 2024)

In addition, walking endurance and gait improved with aerobic exercise, aquatic exercise, assisted gait training, Pilates, resistance training, and more. Overall, the study found that exercise significantly improves balance, walking ability, walking endurance, fatigue, and quality of life, with resistance training being the most effective for reducing fatigue and aerobic exercise having the strongest impact on quality of life.

==== Neurorehabilitation ====
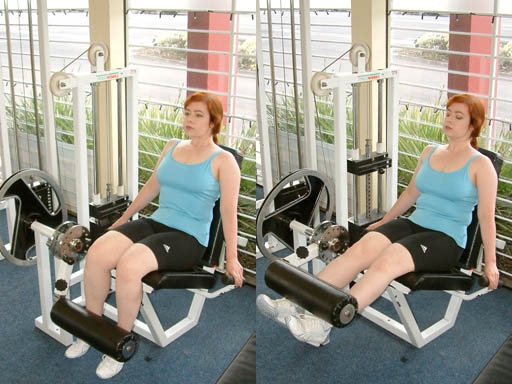
Supervised physical therapy may be helpful to overcome some symptoms.

Although there are relatively few studies of rehabilitation in MS, its general effectiveness, when conducted by a team of specialists, has been clearly demonstrated in other diseases such as stroke or head trauma. As for any patient with neurologic deficits, a multidisciplinary approach is key to limiting and overcoming disability; however there are particular difficulties in specifying a 'core team' because people with MS may need help from almost any health profession or service at some point. Neurologists are mainly involved in the diagnosis and ongoing management of multiple sclerosis, and any exacerbations. The comprehensive rehabilitation process for patients with multiple sclerosis is generally managed by physiatrists. Allied treatments such as physiotherapy, speech and language therapy or occupational therapy can also help to manage some symptoms and maintain quality of life. Treatment of neuropsychiatric symptoms such as emotional distress and clinical depression should involve mental health professionals such as therapists, psychologists, and psychiatrists, while neuropsychologists can help to evaluate and manage cognitive deficits.

Multidisciplinary approaches have been shown to be effective in increasing activity levels and participation in multiple sclerosis. Studies investigating information provision in support of patient understanding and participation suggest that while interventions (written information, decision aids, coaching, educational programmes) may increase patient knowledge, the evidence of an effect on decision making and quality of life is mixed and low certainty. Due to the paucity of randomized controlled studies, there is limited evidence of the overall efficacy of individual therapy disciplines, though there is good evidence that specific approaches, such as exercise, psychology therapies, particularly cognitive behavioral approaches and energy conservation instruction are effective. More specifically psychological interventions seem useful in the treatment of depression, while evidence on effectiveness for other uses such as the treatment of cognitive impairments or vocational counseling is less strong. Cognitive training, alone or combined with other neuropsychological interventions, may show positive effects for memory and attention though firm conclusions are not possible given small sample numbers, variable methodology, interventions and outcome measures. The effectiveness of palliative approaches in addition to standard care is uncertain, due to lack of evidence. It is difficult to be specific about what types of rehabilitation will be most beneficial because therapies are tailored to meet the individual's specific needs.

In regards to well-being, physical therapy focused on gait training can be vital to maximizing MS patient participation via reduction of fatigue during walking and activities of daily living (ADLs). Most gait training is performed over-ground (i.e., in a gym room or outside on uneven ground), on treadmills or, less commonly, using robotic-assisted devices. Robotic-assisted body weight-supported treadmill training may be an effective therapeutic option in MS patients with severe walking impairments. In contrast, over-ground gait training may be most effective in improving gait speed in MS patients with less severe impairments. Equine-assisted therapies such as therapeutic horseback riding and hippotherapy are additional treatments that can positively influence gait, balance and quality of life in people with MS. Another effective modality used in physical therapy to improve gait and balance for MS patients is aquatic therapy. Patients with MS can perform walking, functional exercises, balance training and stretches in aquatic therapy to improve overall gait performance. Aquatic therapy can not only improve gait for MS patients but also dynamic balance and postural stability.

Historically, individuals with MS were advised against participation in physical activity due to worsening symptoms. However, under the direction of an expert, participation in physical activity can be safe and has been proven beneficial for persons with MS. Research has supported the rehabilitative role of physical activity in improving muscle power, mobility, mood, bowel health, general conditioning and quality of life. The effectiveness of interventions, including exercise, specifically for the prevention of falls in people with MS is uncertain, while there is some evidence of an effect on balance function and mobility. Depending on the person, activities may include resistance training, walking, swimming, yoga, tai chi, and others. Determining an appropriate and safe exercise program is challenging and must be carefully individualized to each person being sure to account for all contraindications and precautions.

An elevated core temperature, leading to increased symptom presentation has been noted during exercise, due to variations in circadian body temperature throughout the day, and due to heat exposure including warm temperatures, warm showers, sun bathing, etc. Care should be taken not to overheat a person with MS during the course of exercise. There is some evidence that cooling measures are effective in allowing a greater degree of exercise: cold showers, cold water limb immersion, applying ice packs, and drinking cold beverages. These strategies are effective when attempting to decrease core temperature post-exercise, and as a method of pre-cooling prior to physical activity or heat exposure.

On 26 March 2021, the U.S. Food and Drug Administration (FDA) authorized marketing of a new device indicated for use as a short-term treatment of gait deficit due to mild to moderate symptoms from multiple sclerosis (MS). The device is intended to be used by prescription only as an adjunct to a supervised therapeutic exercise program in patients 22 years of age and older. The device, called Portable Neuromodulation Stimulator (PoNS), is a neuromuscular tongue stimulator that consists of a non-implantable apparatus to generate electrical pulses for stimulation of the trigeminal and facial nerves via the tongue to provide treatment of motor deficits. The PoNS device is a portable, non-implantable device which delivers mild neuromuscular electrical stimulation to the dorsal surface of the tongue.

=== Medical treatments for symptoms ===
Multiple sclerosis can cause a variety of symptoms including changes in sensation (hypoesthesia), muscle weakness, abnormal muscle spasms, impaired movement, difficulties with coordination and balance, problems in speech (known as dysarthria) or swallowing (dysphagia), visual problems (nystagmus, optic neuritis, or diplopia), fatigue and acute or chronic pain syndromes, bladder and bowel difficulties, cognitive impairment, or emotional symptoms (mainly depression). At the same time for each symptom there are different treatment options.

- Bladder: Symptomatology of the urinary tract is common in MS. Treatments for bladder problems vary depending on the origin or type of dysfunction but can mainly divided into treatment of bladder control and incontinence, and of urinary tract infections. Regarding bladder control, some examples of medications used are desmopressin for nocturia and anticholinergic drugs such as oxybutynin and tolterodine for urinary urgency. Non-pharmacological management includes pelvic floor muscle training, stimulation, pessaries, bladder retraining, changes to daily life habits such as clothing, use of external urine collection devices for men and incontinence pads for women; and sometimes intermittent urinary catheterization. Regarding long term catheterization, it is associated to urinary tract infections and should be avoided whenever possible. Some of these recommendations do not come from specific studies in MS but are general recommendations for those who have neurogenic bladder.
- Bowel: bowel problems affect around 70% of the patients. Around 50% of patients have constipation and up to 30% have fecal incontinence. Cause of bowel impairments in MS patients is usually either a reduced gut motility or an impairment in neurological control of defecation. The former is commonly related to inmobility or secondary effects from drugs used in the treatment of the disease. Pain or problems with defecation can be helped with a diet change which includes among other changes an increased fluid intake, oral laxatives or suppositories and enemas when habit changes and oral measures are not enough to control the problems.
- Cognitive and emotional: neuropsychiatric symptomatology is common in the course of the disease. Depression and anxiety appear in up to 80% of patients. Emotional lability leading to uncontrollable crying is also common. These symptoms can be treated with antidepressants and cognitive behavioral therapy; however, high quality studies on efficacy are lacking. For example, in the specific case of antidepressants and depression, only two studies were considered worth considering as of 2011 by the Cochrane collaboration and they only showed a trend towards efficacy. While non-invasive brain stimulation with techniques such as transcranial magnetic stimulation could prove beneficial for depression in multiple sclerosis, disease specific studies have been limited and may require targeting of specific brain networks associated with depression in multiple sclerosis. Other neuropsychiatric symptoms are euphoria and disinhibition. Cognitive impairment is a frequent complication of MS even after the introduction of disease-modifying treatments in the last 20 years. Although the disease is usually the primary cause of cognitive problems, other factors such as medications, relapses or depression may be enhancing them so a correct evaluation of the deficits and factors exacerbating them is important. Regarding primary deficits, data point towards administration of L-amphetamine and methylphenidate being useful, whereas memantine and anticholinesterase drugs such as donepezil —commonly used in Alzheimer's disease— are not considered effective in improving cognitive functions. The effectiveness of cognitive rehabilitation therapy is less clear. For those patients with MS who have pseudobulbar affect (PBA), characterized by uncontrollable episodes of crying and/or laughing, or other emotional displays, Dextromethorphan/quinidine can be considered as treatment as it is the only FDA approved drug for treatment for PBA, though other medications such as selective serotonin reuptake inhibitors, tricyclic antidepressants have been used in clinical practice.
- Dysphagia and dysarthria: dysphagia is a difficulty with eating and swallowing which may cause choking and aspiration of food or liquid into the lungs, while dysarthria is a neurological motor speech disorder characterized by poor control over the subsystems and muscles responsible for speech ("articulation"). A speech and language therapist may give advice on specific swallowing techniques, on adapting food consistencies and dietary intake, on techniques to improve and maintain speech production and clarity, and on alternative communication approaches. In the case of advanced dysphagia, food can be supplied by a nasogastric tube, which is a tube that goes through the nose directly to the stomach; or a percutaneous endoscopic gastrostomy (PEG), which is a procedure for placing a tube into the stomach and therefore administering food directly to it.
- Erectile dysfunction: erectile dysfunction is common in male patients with MS. There is some evidence indicating that sildenafil citrate may be a useful treatment. Prostaglandin E1 has shown benefits for patients with erectile dysfunction due to a range of causes including multiple sclerosis.
- Fatigue: fatigue is very common and disabling in MS, and at the same time it has a close relationship with depressive symptomatology. When depression is reduced fatigue also tends to improve, so patients should be evaluated for depression before other therapeutic approaches are used. In a similar way, other factors such as disturbed sleep, chronic pain, poor nutrition, or even some medications can contribute to fatigue; medical professionals are therefore encouraged to identify and modify them. A few medications have been studied to treat MS-related fatigue, such as amantadine pemoline (which is a psychostimulant also used for attention-deficit hyperactivity disorder and narcolepsy), or modafinil, as well as psychological interventions of energy conservation, but the effects of all of them are small. Fatigue is therefore a very difficult symptom to manage for which no drugs are recommended.
- Pain: acute pain is mainly due to optic neuritis (with corticosteroids being the best treatment available), as well as trigeminal neuralgia, Lhermitte's sign, or dysesthesias. Subacute pain is usually secondary to the disease and can be a consequence of spending too long in the same position, urinary retention, and infected skin ulcers, amongst others. Treatment will depend on cause. Chronic pain is very common and harder to treat as its most common cause is dysesthesias. Acute pain due to trigeminal neuralgia is usually successfully treated with anticonvulsants such as carbamazepine or phenytoin. Both Lhermitte's sign and painful dysesthesias usually respond to treatment with carbamazepine, clonazepam, or amitriptyline. Sativex is approved for treatment of pain in MS in different countries, but due to its derivation from cannabis, it is currently not available in others, such as the USA. This medication is also being investigated for the management of other MS symptoms, such as spasticity, and has shown long-term safety and efficacy. The evidence for the effectiveness of non-pharmacological interventions for chronic pain is limited, very low quality and insufficient to recommend such interventions alone, however their use in combination with pharmacological agents may be reasonable.
- Spasticity: spasticity is characterized by increased stiffness and slowness in limb movement, the development of certain postures, an association with weakness of voluntary muscle power, and with involuntary and sometimes painful spasms of limbs. A physiotherapist can help to reduce spasticity and avoid the development of contractures with techniques such as passive stretching. Nabiximols is safe and effective for relieving spasticity. There is evidence, albeit limited, of the clinical effectiveness of baclofen, dantrolene, diazepam, and tizanidine. In the most complicated cases intrathecal injections of baclofen can be used. There are also palliative measures like castings, splints or customized seatings. Among non-pharmacological interventions there is low level and limited evidence of a benefit for spasticity for people with multiple sclerosis for physical activity programs, transcranial magnetic stimulation and pulsed electromagnetic therapy. Systematic review has found no evidence of benefit exists for transcutaneous electrical nerve stimulation, sports climbing and vibration therapy.
- Vision: different drugs as well as optic compensatory systems and prisms can be used to improve the symptoms of nystagmus or diplopia (double vision). Surgery can also be used in some cases.
- Walking: dalfampridine (ampyra) is a broad-spectrum potassium channel blocker. It is approved by the FDA to treat walking difficulties in MS. It has been shown to increase walking speed, although its high cost (over 1000 dollars a month) limits its usage.

Other symptoms, such as ataxia, tremor or sensory losses, do not have proven treatments. Evidence for an effect of respiratory muscle training is heterogeneous and low quality, while the effect on important outcomes like cough efficacy, pneumonia, and quality of life have not been evaluated. Epileptic seizures are a potentially serious comorbidity in people in multiple sclerosis which is uncommon but nonetheless present more often than in the general population, however there is currently a lack of evidence on the efficacy and safety of anti-epileptic medication specifically in people with multiple sclerosis.

== Research ==
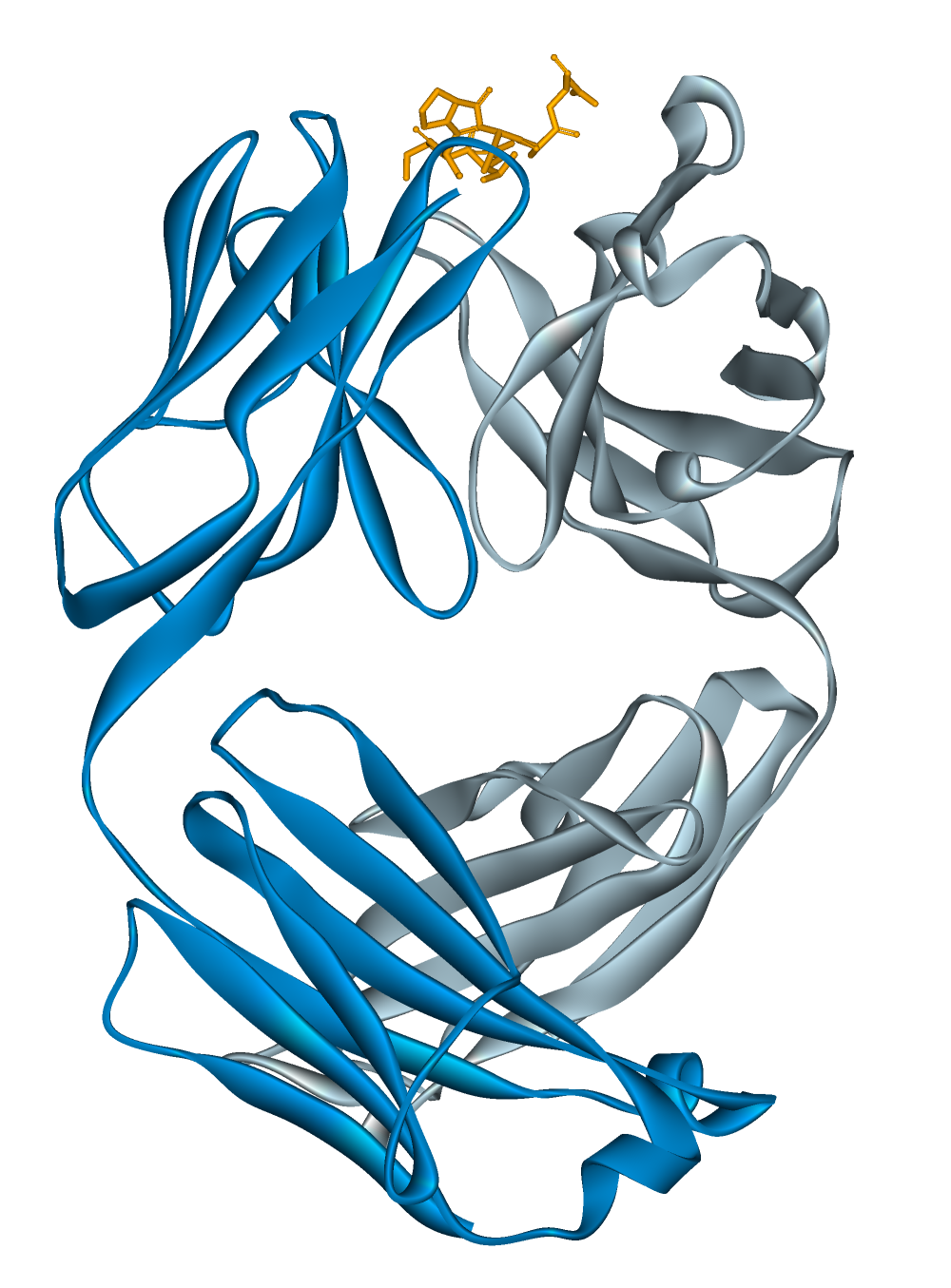
Chemical structure of alemtuzumab

Research directions on MS treatments include investigations of MS pathogenesis and heterogeneity; research of more effective, convenient, or tolerable new treatments for RRMS; creation of therapies for the progressive subtypes; neuroprotection strategies; and the search for effective symptomatic treatments.

Advances during the last decades has led to the recent approval of several oral drugs. These drugs are expected to gain in popularity and frequency of use at the expense of previously existing therapies. Further oral drugs are still under investigation, the most notable example being laquinimod, which was announced in August 2012 to be the focus of a third phase III trial after mixed results in the previous ones. Similarly, Other studies are aimed to improve efficacy and ease of use of already existing therapies through the use of novel preparations. Such is the case the PEGylated version of interferon-β-1a, that has a longer life than normal interferon and therefore it is being studied if given at less frequent doses has a similar efficacy than the existing product. With the completion of a robust two-year study, it is shown that the PEGylated interferon beta-1a has greater efficacy in decreasing relapse rate and disability progression compared to placebo for MS patients.

Preliminary data have suggested that mycophenolate mofetil, an anti-rejection immunosuppressant medication, might have benefits in people with multiple sclerosis. However a systematic review found that the limited evidence available was insufficient to determine the effects of mycophenolate mofetil as an add‐on therapy for interferon beta-1a in people with RRMS.

Monoclonal antibodies, which are drugs of the same family as natalizumab, have also raised high levels of interest and research. Alemtuzumab, daclizumab and CD20 monoclonal antibodies such as rituximab, ocrelizumab and ofatumumab have all shown some benefit and are under study as potential treatments for MS. Nevertheless, their use has also been accompanied by the appearance of potentially dangerous adverse effects, most importantly opportunistic infections. Related to these investigations is the recent development of a test against JC virus antibodies which might help to predict what patients are at a greater risk of developing progressive multifocal leukoencephalopathy when taking natalizumab. While monoclonal antibodies are probably going to have some role in the treatment of the disease in the future, it is believed that it will be small due to the risks associated to them.

Another research strategy is to evaluate the combined effectiveness of two or more drugs. The main rationale for polytherapy in MS is that the involved treatments target different mechanisms of the disease and therefore their use is not necessarily exclusive. Moreover, synergies, in which a drug potentiates the effect of another are also possible. Nevertheless, there can also appear important drawbacks such as antagonizing mechanisms of action or potentiation of deleterious secondary effects. While there have been several clinical trials of combined therapy none has shown positive enough effects to merit the consideration as a viable treatment for MS.

Likewise, there are not any effective treatments for the progressive variants of the disease. Many of the newest drugs as well as those under development are probably going to be evaluated as therapies for PPMS or SPMS, and their improved effectiveness when compared with previously existing drugs may eventually lead to a positive result in these groups of patients.

Medications that influence voltage-gated sodium ion channels are under investigation as a potential neuroprotective strategy because of hypothesized role of sodium in the pathological process leading to axonal injury and accumulating disability. Currently, there is insufficient evidence of an effect of sodium channel blockers for people with MS.

There is growing developments in the area of medical imaging and MRI, allowing for better reviews and understandings of MS in patients and how to treat each case in a more effective method.

=== Stem cell transplant ===
Finally, regarding neuroprotective and specially regenerative treatments, such as stem cell therapy, while their research is considered of high importance at the moment they are only a promise of future therapeutic approaches.

A 2018 study found promising results in relapsing-remitting MS but more research is needed.

=== CCSVI ===
In 2008, vascular surgeon Paolo Zamboni suggested that MS involves a vascular process he referred to as chronic cerebrospinal venous insufficiency (CCSVI), in which veins from the brain are constricted. He found CCSVI in all 65 patients with MS in his study. This theory received important attention in the media and among people with MS, specially in Canada. Concern has been raised with Zamboni's research as it was neither blinded nor controlled, and additionally its assumptions about the pathophisiology of the disease may not be backed by known data. Also further studies have either not found a relationship or found a much less strong one. This has raised objections to the hypothesis of CCSVI originating MS. The "liberation procedure" has been criticized for possibly resulting in serious complications and deaths while its benefits have not been proven. Currently it is recommended not to use the proposed treatment unless its effectiveness is confirmed by controlled studies. Research on CCSVI has been fast tracked but researchers have been unable to confirm whether CCSVI has a role in causing MS.

== Alternative treatments ==
Over 50% of MS patients may use complementary and alternative medicine, although numbers vary greatly depending on the definition of alternative medicine used. In the United States, it is estimated that 75% of the MS patient populations use at least one complementary and alternative medicine for treatment and symptomatic control. The evidence for effectiveness for such treatments in most cases is weak or absent. Examples of treatments used by patients include dietary supplementation and regimens such as vitamin D, calcium, vitamin B12, and antioxidants. The rationale behind the use of Vitamin D supplementation is that studies show an association between vitamin D deficiency and increasing progression of MS, as well as the anti-inflammatory effects of vitamin D. However available evidence suggests vitamin D supplementation, irrespective of the form and dose used, provides no apparent benefit for people with MS for measures such as relapse recurrence of, disability worsening and MRI lesions while effects on health‐related quality of life and fatigue are unclear.

For antioxidant therapy, studies have shown that reactive oxidative species lead to the formation of multiple sclerosis lesions in which antioxidants can help induce neuroprotective and immunomodulatory effects. Probably the most clear disease modifying factor (for worse) is smoking, and therefore to quit smoking should be considered.

Other alternative treatments include relaxation techniques such as yoga, herbal medicine (including the use of medical cannabis), hyperbaric oxygenation, self-infection with hookworm (known generally as helminthic therapy) and bee venom therapy, reflexology or acupuncture. Regarding the characteristics of users, they are more frequently women, have had MS for a longer time and tend to be more disabled. Moreover, they also have lower levels of satisfaction with conventional healthcare.
