= Ocrelizumab/hyaluronidase =

Combination medication

Combination of
- Ocrelizumab: Monoclonal antibody
- Hyaluronidase: Endoglycosidase

Clinical data
- Trade names: Ocrevus Zunovo
- AHFS/Drugs.com: Ocrevus-zunovo
- License data: US DailyMed: Ocrelizumab and hyaluronidase
- Routes of administration: Subcutaneous
- ATC code: None

Legal status
- Legal status: US: ℞-only

Ocrelizumab/hyaluronidase, sold under the brand name Ocrevus Zunovo, is a fixed-dose combination medication used for the treatment of multiple sclerosis. It contains ocrelizumab, a recombinant humanized monoclonal antibody directed at CD20; and hyaluronidase (human recombinant), an endoglycosidase. It is taken by subcutaneous injection.

Ocrelizumab/hyaluronidase was approved for medical use in the United States in September 2024.

== Medical uses ==
Ocrelizumab/hyaluronidase is indicated for the treatment of relapsing forms of multiple sclerosis, to include clinically isolated syndrome, relapsing-remitting disease, and active secondary progressive disease; and primary progressive multiple sclerosis.
