= Tcelna =

Tcelna (formerly known as Tovaxin) is an anti-T cell vaccine being studied in multiple sclerosis (MS). As of 2016 it is in phase II trials.

== History ==
The company announced in late 2005 that the U.S. Food and Drug Administration had approved the protocol for the Phase IIb clinical trial of Tcelna.

The multicenter, randomized, double blind, placebo-controlled Phase IIb clinical study on 150 patients was designed to evaluate the efficacy, safety and tolerability of the therapy with clinically isolated syndrome (CIS) and early relapsing-remitting MS (RR-MS) patients.

The first phase of the trial finished in March 2008. All patients who completed the trial were to be eligible for an optional one-year extension study, OLTERMS, to receive Tcelna open-label without a placebo group; however, that program was terminated suddenly for lack of funding.

After several financial troubles, the trials were restarted in 2011 and Opexa rebranded the therapy, previous called Tovaxin, with the new name Tcelna.
