= Ocrelizumab =

Anti-CD20 monoclonal antibody

Monoclonal antibody
- Type: Whole antibody
- Source: Humanized (from mouse)
- Target: CD20

Clinical data
- Trade names: Ocrevus
- AHFS/Drugs.com: Monograph
- MedlinePlus: a617026
- License data: US DailyMed: Ocrelizumab
- Pregnancy category: AU: C
- Routes of administration: Intravenous infusion, subcutaneous injection
- ATC code: L04AG08 (WHO)

Legal status
- Legal status: AU: S4 (Prescription only); CA: ℞-only / Schedule D; UK: POM (Prescription only); US: ℞-only; EU: Rx-only; In general: ℞ (Prescription only)

Identifiers
- CAS Number: 637334-45-3
- DrugBank: DB11988
- ChemSpider: none
- UNII: A10SJL62JY
- KEGG: D05218

Chemical and physical data
- Formula: C_{6494}H_{9978}N_{1718}O_{2014}S_{46}
- Molar mass: 145818.03 g·mol^{−1}

S

Ocrelizumab, sold under the brand name Ocrevus, is a medication used to treat multiple sclerosis. It is administered by intravenous infusion. The fixed-dose combination ocrelizumab/hyaluronidase is administered by subcutaneous injection.

It is a humanized anti-CD20 monoclonal antibody. It targets CD20 marker on B lymphocytes and is an immunosuppressive drug. It binds to an epitope that overlaps with the epitope to which rituximab binds.

It was approved in the USA in 2017. It was the first FDA approved drug for the primary progressive form of multiple sclerosis; it was discovered and developed and is marketed by Hoffmann–La Roche's subsidiary Genentech. With the approval, the FDA also required the company to conduct several phase IV trials to better understand whether the medication is safe and effective in young people, cancer risks, and effects on pregnant women and children they might bear. The US Food and Drug Administration (FDA) considers it to be a first-in-class medication.

== Medical uses ==
On-label uses

In the US, ocrelizumab is indicated for the treatment of relapsing forms of multiple sclerosis (MS), to include clinically isolated syndrome and relapsing-remitting multiple sclerosis (RRMS). It is also approved primary progressive multiple sclerosis (PPMS) in adults. May of 2026, FDA approved treatments on children aged 10 years or more, weighing at least 55 pounds (25kg).

In the EU, ocrelizumab is indicated for the treatment of adults with relapsing forms of multiple sclerosis with active disease defined by clinical or imaging features and for the treatment of adults with early primary progressive multiple sclerosis in terms of disease duration and level of disability, and with imaging features characteristic of inflammatory activity.

Off-label uses

Ocrelizumab has been reported for its treatment in neuromyelitis optica spectrum disorder (NMOSD), which is another autoimmune disease that affects the central nervous system.

== Contraindications ==
Ocrelizumab should not be used in people with hepatitis B infection or a history of severe reaction to this drug. If someone has an infection or infectious disease, treatment should be delayed until the infection is resolved. It has not been tested in pregnant women, but based on animal studies does not appear to be safe for pregnant women; it is excreted in breast milk, and effects on infants are unknown.

== Adverse effects ==
As of October 2016, the three phase III clinical trials of ocrelizumab used to obtain approval had not been published. Based on published data from clinical trials at that time, the most common adverse events were infusion reactions including itchy skin, rash, hives, flushing, throat and mouth irritation, fever, fatigue, nausea, rapid heartbeat, headache, and dizziness. One person died from systemic inflammatory response syndrome and in another trial, rates of cancer were three times higher (2.3% vs. 0.8%) in people taking the drug than people taking placebo. Clinical trials in rheumatoid arthritis and lupus were halted because rates of serious infections were too high; these results were not seen in published trials in people with multiple sclerosis, and the differences may be due to the differences in the bodies of people with the different diseases, as well as other drugs they were taking.

There is an increased risk of infections of all kinds, including respiratory infections, in people taking immunosuppressive drugs like ocrelizumab. In clinical trials submitted to the US Food and Drug Administration (FDA), more people taking ocrelizumab suffered infections than people taking Interferon beta-1a did, including upper and lower respiratory infections, herpes, and hepatitis B reactivation. The risk of progressive multifocal leukoencephalopathy, a disease caused by viral infection of the brain, is also increased.

An increased risk of malignancy with ocrelizumab may exist. In controlled trials, malignancies, including breast cancer, occurred more frequently in people treated with ocrelizumab. Breast cancer occurred in 6 of 781 females treated with ocrelizumab for multiple sclerosis in clinical trials. None of 668 females treated in Rebif (interferon beta-1a) or placebo arms of the clinical trials developed breast cancer.

== Pharmacology ==
Ocrelizumab binding to CD20 on B lymphocytes and promoting B-cell depletion via antibody-dependent cellular cytotoxicity (ADCC) and complement-dependent cytotoxicity (CDC)

Ocrelizumab is an immunosuppressive drug; it binds to CD20, which is selectively made and membrane-expressed by B cells. When ocrelizumab binds to CD20 on B cells, these cells are deleted by antibody-dependent cell-mediated cytotoxicity and, to a lesser extent, complement-dependent cytotoxicity. ADCC involves immune cells recognizing the Fc region of the antibody, ocrelizumab and destroying it. CDC happens when complement proteins attach to the antibody and activates a cascade of reactions. This process then leads to the membrane attack complex (NAC), which ends up damaging the B-cell membrane causing cell lysis .

Ocrelizumab causes rapid depletion of circulating CD-20 positive B cells. CD-19 positive B-cell counts are used to monitor B cell depletion since Ocrelizumab binding to CD-20 causes interference with CD20 measurement. According to Clinical studies, there was a reduction in B-cell counts within 14 days of administration.

Drug	Reported B-cell depletion	Replasing MS	PPMS
Ocrelizumab	Near complete depletion by 2 weeks, was maintained with continued treatment	FDA approved	FDA approved
Rituximab	Over 95% by 2 weeks, around 69% by week 48	Off-Label	Off-Label
Ofatumumab	Approximately 99% by week 2; maintained through week 12	FDA approved	Not FDA approved
Ublituximab	Approximately 97% within 24 hours over 99% by 4 weeks. Depletion maintained for week 24 to 48	FDA-approved	Not FDA approved

== Administration ==
Ocrelizumab is administered both Intravenously (IV) and subcutaneous infusion (SC).

Intravenous (IV) administration: Initial dose: 300mg on Day 1. Second dose: 300mg, two weeks after initial treatment. Maintenance dose: 600mg every six month.

Subcutaneous (SC) administration: Injected into the abdomen area, below the skin. Each dose contains total of 23,000 units of hyaluronidase and 920mg of ocrelizumab, in a total volume of 23ml.

== Bioavailability ==
Cmax: 212mcg/ml, followed by a 600mg IV infusion. 132mcg/mL on a subcutaneous infusion administration.

Tmax: End of IV fusions. On subcutaneous administration, it reached after 4 days.

Half Life: 26 days for Intravenous administration. 20 days for Subcutaneous administration.

Food interactions: Food doesn't affect IV or Subcutaneous administration.

== Pharmacokinetics ==
Absorption: Intravenous administration (IV) and subcutaneous infusion (SC). Subcutaneous administration has a bioavailibity of 81%.

Distribution: Central volume distribution is 2.78L. Peripheral volume of distribution is 2.68L.

Metabolism: Ocrelizumab gets broken down via protein catabolism (enzymatic degradation)

Elimination: Drug has a 26 day half-life when administered (IV) and 20 days half life Subcutaneous Infusion (SC).

== Pharmacogenetics ==
A 2026 study showed that differences between FCFR3A gene can affect how Ocrelizumab work, differences may affect how quick B cells return during longer treatment periods.

== Chemistry ==
Ocrelizumab is a humanized monoclonal antibody that binds to a CD20 epitope that overlaps partially with the epitope to which rituximab binds. It has an immunoglobulin G1 with a variable region against human CD20, with a human-mouse monoclonal 2H7 γ1-chain, bound via disulfide links with human-mouse monoclonal 2H7 κ-chain in a dimer.

== Clinical Trail Data ==
Ocrelizumab went through three major trails. OPERA I and OPERA II trails examined patients with relapsing form of multiple sclerosis (RMS). ORATORIO trail studied patients with Primary Progressive Multiple Sclerosis (PPMS). OPERA trails showed, patients treated with ocrelizumab had a 46-47% relapses than patients treated with interferon beta-1a. Ocrelizumab has also proved to reduce the risk of progressive disability by 40%. ORATORIO showed that patients receiving ocrelizumab had 24% lower risk of disability progression compared to placebo.

== History ==
A study of rituximab in multiple sclerosis with strong results published in 2008, drove interest in B-cell depletion as a strategy to treat multiple sclerosis and has led to extensive off-label use of rituximab to treat primary and relapsing multiple sclerosis. Rituximab is a mouse protein, and is immunogenic in humans, and Genentech and its parent Roche decided to focus on the similar, but humanized mAb that they already had, ocrelizumab, for multiple sclerosis instead.

Clinical trials in people with rheumatoid arthritis and lupus were halted in 2010 because people with these conditions developed too many opportunistic infections when taking ocrelizumab. It was also studied in hematological cancer.

In multiple sclerosis, phase II results were announced in October 2010, and in October 2015, Genentech presented interim results of three Phase III clinical trials. In February 2016, the US Food and Drug Administration (FDA) granted breakthrough therapy designation for primary progressive multiple sclerosis.

In March 2017, the FDA approved ocrelizumab for relapsing-remitting and primary-progressive multiple sclerosis. It is the first FDA-approved treatment for the primary progressive form. When the FDA approved the drug, it required Roche to conduct several Phase IV clinical trials, including: a two-part study in people between ten and 17 years old with relapsing multiple sclerosis to determine dosing, then safety and efficacy in these people, required to be completed by 2024; a prospective five-year study to better understand the risk of cancer, required to be completed by 2030; a prospective study creating a registry of women with MS exposed to ocrelizumab before and during pregnancy, women with MS not exposed to ocrelizumab, and women without MS, to understand the effect on women and children they might bear, due by 2029; an additional pregnancy outcomes study due by 2024; and an additional non-human primate study on fetal development and outcomes due by 2019.

The efficacy of ocrelizumab for the treatment of relapsing forms of multiple sclerosis was shown in two clinical trials in 1,656 participants treated for 96 weeks. Both studies compared ocrelizumab to another MS drug, Rebif (interferon beta-1a). In both studies, the participants receiving ocrelizumab had reduced relapse rates and reduced worsening of disability compared to Rebif. The trials were conducted in the US, Canada, Europe, Latin America, Africa, and Australia.

In a study of PPMS in 732 participants treated for at least 120 weeks, those receiving ocrelizumab showed a longer time to the worsening of disability compared to placebo. The study was conducted in the US, Canada, and Europe.

The application for ocrelizumab was granted breakthrough therapy, fast track, and priority review designations. The FDA granted approval of Ocrevus to Genentech, Inc.

Ocrelizumab was approved for use in the European Union in January 2018. In June 2024, the European Commission granted marketing authorization for the fixed-dose combination ocrelizumab/hyaluronidase to be used for subcutaneous injection. The FDA approved the fixed-dose combination ocrelizumab/hyaluronidase as a subcutaneous formulation in September 2024.
