= Masitinib =

Chemical compound

Clinical data
- Trade names: Masivet, Kinavet
- AHFS/Drugs.com: International Drug Names
- ATC code: L01EX06 (WHO)

Identifiers
- IUPAC name: 4-[(4-Methylpiperazin-1-yl)methyl]-N-(4-methyl-3-{[4-(pyridin-3-yl)-1,3-thiazol-2-yl]amino}phenyl)benzamide
- CAS Number: 790299-79-5
- PubChem CID: 10074640
- ChemSpider: 8250179
- UNII: M59NC4E26P
- KEGG: D10229
- ChEMBL: ChEMBL1908391
- PDB ligand: G65 (PDBe, RCSB PDB)
- CompTox Dashboard (EPA): DTXSID001000207

Chemical and physical data
- Formula: C_{28}H_{30}N_{6}OS
- Molar mass: 498.65 g·mol^{−1}
- 3D model (JSmol): Interactive image
- SMILES: O=C(c1ccc(cc1)CN2CCN(C)CC2)Nc3cc(c(cc3)C)Nc4nc(cs4)c5cccnc5
- InChI: InChI=InChI=1S/C28H30N6OSc1-20-5-10-24(16-25(20)31-28-32-26(19-36-28)23-4-3-11-29-17-23)30-27(35)22-8-6-21(7-9-22)18-34-14-12-33(2)13-15-34h3-11,16-17,19H,12-15,18H2,1-2H3,(H,30,35)(H,31,32); Key:WJEOLQLKVOPQFV-UHFFFAOYSA-N

Masitinib is a tyrosine-kinase inhibitor used in the treatment of mast cell tumours in animals, specifically dogs. Since its introduction in November 2008 it has been distributed under the commercial name Masivet. It has been available in Europe since the second part of 2009. Masitinib has been studied for several human conditions including melanoma, multiple myeloma, gastrointestinal cancer, pancreatic cancer, Alzheimer's disease, multiple sclerosis, rheumatoid arthritis, mastocytosis, amyotrophic lateral sclerosis, and COVID-19.

== Mechanism of action ==
Masitinib is a tyrosine kinase inhibitor which inhibits tyrosine kinases, enzymes responsible for the activation of many proteins by signal transduction cascades. Specifically, masitinib targets the receptor tyrosine kinase c-Kit which is found to be overexpressed or mutated in several types of cancer. In addition to cKit, Masitinib also has additional targets, and it inhibits platelet derived growth factor receptor (PDGFR), lymphocyte-specific protein tyrosine kinase (Lck), focal adhesion kinase (FAK) and fibroblast growth factor receptor 3 (FGFR3) as well as CSF1R.

Masitinib has been shown to block the replication of SARS-CoV-2 by inhibiting its main protease, 3CLpro. Masitinib showed >200-fold reduction in viral titers in the lungs and nose of mice infected with SARS-CoV-2.

== Society and culture ==
=== Legal status ===
Masitinib was under investigation for the treatment of systemic mastocytosis (Masipro) but approval was denied in the EU in 2017 due to concerns "about the reliability of the study results" and major changes to the study design. European approval of masitinib for treatment of amyotrophic lateral sclerosis (Alsitek) was also refused in 2018.

In June 2024, the Committee for Medicinal Products for Human Use (CHMP) of the European Medicines Agency recommended the refusal of a marketing authorization for Masitinib AB Science, a medicine intended for the treatment of amyotrophic lateral sclerosis, a rare disease of the nervous system leading to loss of muscle function and paralysis. In October 2024, following a re-examination, the CHMP confirmed its recommendation to refuse the granting of a conditional marketing authorization for Masitinib AB Science.
