= Laquinimod =

Names
- Preferred IUPAC name 5-Chloro-N-ethyl-4-hydroxy-1-methyl-2-oxo-N-phenyl-1,2-dihydroquinoline-3-carboxamide

Identifiers
CAS Number	248281-84-7
3D model (JSmol)	Interactive image
ChEMBL	ChEMBL66092
ChemSpider	11444966
ECHA InfoCard	100.220.145
IUPHAR/BPS	7639
PubChem CID	216469
UNII	908SY76S4G
CompTox Dashboard (EPA)	DTXSID30179536
- InChI: InChI=1S/C19H17ClN2O3/c1-3-22(12-8-5-4-6-9-12)19(25)16-17(23)15-13(20)10-7-11-14(15)21(2)18(16)24/h4-11,23H,3H2,1-2H3 Key: GKWPCEFFIHSJOE-UHFFFAOYSA-N; InChI=1/C19H17ClN2O3/c1-3-22(12-8-5-4-6-9-12)19(25)16-17(23)15-13(20)10-7-11-14(15)21(2)18(16)24/h4-11,23H,3H2,1-2H3 Key: GKWPCEFFIHSJOE-UHFFFAOYAW
- SMILES: CCN(c1ccccc1)C(=O)C\3=C(/O)c2c(Cl)cccc2N(C)C/3=O

Properties
Chemical formula	C_{19}H_{17}ClN_{2}O_{3}
Molar mass	356.803 g/mol

Pharmacology
ATC code	N07XX10 (WHO)
- Except where otherwise noted, data are given for materials in their standard state (at 25 °C [77 °F], 100 kPa). verify (what is ?) Infobox references

Laquinimod is an experimental immunomodulator developed by Active Biotech and Teva. It is being investigated as an oral treatment for multiple sclerosis (MS) and Huntington's disease.

Laquinimod is the successor of Active Biotech's failed experimental immunomodulator linomide.

The compound has been investigated in two Phase II trials using successive magnetic resonance scans (MRI). Laquinimod seems to be able to reduce the MS disease activity on MRI. However, the response to a given dose was discrepant between both studies.

Phase III studies for MS started in December 2007. In 2011, Teva announced its clinical trials involving laquinimod had failed, being unable to significantly reduce relapses in MS among patients beyond a placebo. However, the final results of above-mentioned phase III trial proved oral laquinimod administered once daily slowed the progression of disability and reduced the rate of relapse in patients with relapsing–remitting multiple sclerosis.

On May 7, 2013, laquinimod was approved by the Russian Ministry of Health (the FDA analog) as a treatment for relapsing-remitting multiple sclerosis (RRMS) under the brand name Nerventra.

== See also ==
- Management of multiple sclerosis
