= Ublituximab =

Chemical compound

Monoclonal antibody
- Type: Whole antibody
- Source: Chimeric (mouse/human)
- Target: CD20

Clinical data
- Trade names: Briumvi
- Other names: ublituximab-xiiy
- AHFS/Drugs.com: Monograph
- MedlinePlus: a623008
- License data: US DailyMed: Ublituximab
- Routes of administration: Intravenous
- ATC code: L04AG14 (WHO)

Legal status
- Legal status: US: ℞-only; EU: Rx-only

Identifiers
- CAS Number: 1174014-05-1
- DrugBank: DB11850
- ChemSpider: none
- UNII: U59UGK3IPC
- KEGG: D11243

Chemical and physical data
- Formula: C_{6418}H_{9866}N_{1702}O_{2006}S_{48}
- Molar mass: 144504.31 g·mol^{−1}

Ublituximab, sold under the brand name Briumvi, is an immunomodulator used for the treatment of multiple sclerosis. It is a CD20-directed cytolytic monoclonal antibody.

The most common adverse reactions include infusion reactions, including fever, chills, headache, influenza-like illness, elevated heart rate, nausea, throat irritation, reddening of the skin (erythema) and an anaphylactic (allergic) reaction; infections including serious and fatal bacterial, fungal, and new or reactivated viral infections and reduction in immunoglobulins.

It was approved for medical use in the United States in December 2022, and in the European Union in May 2023.

== Medical uses ==
Ublituximab is indicated for the treatment of relapsing forms of multiple sclerosis.

== History ==
Ublituximab was designed as part of a research program by the French Laboratory of Fractionation and Biotechnology, with the initial objective of addressing a clinical need in chronic B-lymphocytic leukemia. The design of ublituximab has been optimized to enhance the activation of killer immune cells while minimizing side effects, through modifications to its structure and glycosylation. After clinical trials confirming its strong cytotoxic activity and ability to eliminate B cells, the development of ublituximab was pursued by the American biopharmaceutical company TG Therapeutics.

The US Food and Drug Administration approved ublituximab based on evidence from two clinical trials of 1,093 participants with relapsing forms of multiple sclerosis. The trials were conducted at 110 of sites in 10 countries in North America and Europe. The trials were used to assess both efficacy and safety of ublituximab. Participants received ublituximab or teriflunomide for up to 96 weeks. Neither the participants nor the health care providers knew which treatment was being given until the trials were completed. The benefit of ublituximab was evaluated based on the annualized relapse rate, or the number of relapses per year, over the treatment period.

== Society and culture ==
=== Legal status ===
Ublituximab was approved for medical use in the United States in December 2022, and in the European Union in May 2023.

=== Names ===
Ublituximab is the international nonproprietary name (INN).

Ublituximab is sold under the brand name Briumvi.
