= Schilder =

Schilder is mainly a Dutch surname, meaning "painter". Notable people with the surname include:

- Anny Schilder (born 1959), Dutch singer
- Cornelius Schilder (born 1941), Dutch bishop
- Franz Alfred Schilder (1896–1970), Austrian-German zoologist
- Henny Schilder (born 1984), Dutch football player
- Herbert Schilder (1928–2006), American dental surgeon
- Hilton Schilder (born 1959), South African musician
- Klaas Schilder (1890–1952), Dutch theologian
- Maria Schilder (1898–1975), German zoologist
- Mike Schilder (born 1994), Dutch basketball player
- Nick Schilder (born 1983), Dutch singer-songwriter
- Paul Ferdinand Schilder (1886–1940), Austrian neurologist, psychiatrist and psychoanalyst
- Robbert Schilder (born 1986), Dutch footballer
- Shanna Schilder, Dutch politician
- Simone Schilder (born 1967), Dutch tennis player

== See also ==
- Nikolay Shilder, Russian (Baltic German) painter
- Louis Schilders, a Belgian engineer and businessman
- Schilder's disease (disambiguation)
- Schilder's theorem
- Schilde
- Schildt
