= CNS demyelinating autoimmune diseases =

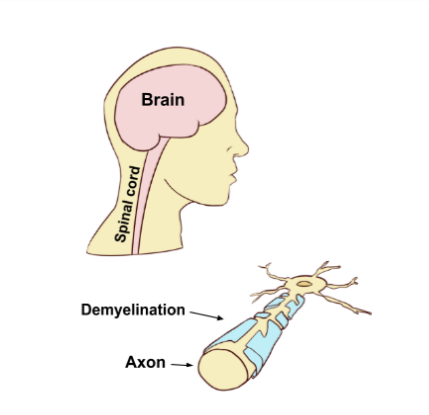
- The demyelination of the Central Nervous System
- Specialty: Neurology, immunology

CNS demyelinating autoimmune diseases are autoimmune diseases which primarily affect the central nervous system.

== Types ==
Examples include:

- Diffuse cerebral sclerosis of Schilder
- Acute disseminated encephalomyelitis
- Acute hemorrhagic leukoencephalitis
- Multiple sclerosis (though the cause is unknown, it is sure that immune system is involved)
- Transverse myelitis
- Neuromyelitis optica

== Presentation ==
Since the neural impulse is inhibited in this condition it may lead to paresthesia, muscle weakness, unsteady gait, paralysis, vision loss and other motor dysfunctions.

== Causes ==
CNS demyelination autoimmune disease causes the myelin sheath to deteriorate since the sense of recognition of self is lost. The loss of the myelin insulation either disrupts or prevents neural conduction along the nerve cell's axon.

== Nervous System ==
The brain and the spinal cord are the essential components of the central nervous system and it is responsible for the integration of the signals received from the afferent nerves and initiates action. The nerve cells, known as neurons, carry impulses throughout the body and the nerve impulses are carried along the axon. These microscopic nerve fibers, where the action potential occurs, are protected by a white, fatty tissue that surrounds and insulates it, known as the myelin sheath. This insulation helps the axon of a nerve cell with the conduction and speed of the signal along the axon.

== Pathogenesis ==
The pathogenesis of the demyelination can vary. Some of the factors that contribute to the deteriorating of the myelin are due to inflammatory processes, acquired metabolic derangements, viral demyelination, and hypoxic-ischaemic demyelination.

== See also ==
- Idiopathic inflammatory demyelinating diseases
- Demyelinating disease
