= Schilder's disease =

Schilder's disease may refer to two different diseases described by Paul Schilder:

- Adrenoleukodystrophy
- Diffuse myelinoclastic sclerosis
