= Louis Schilders =

Belgian engineer and businessman

- Education: Electrical engineer at the University of Ghent
- Occupations: Engineer and Businessman

Louis Schilders is a Belgian engineer and businessman in healthcare ICT.

He graduated as an electrical engineer at the University of Ghent (Ghent, Belgium) and started his career as systems analyst, project leader and IT consultant working for several companies. He worked as a consultant at the European Commission for four years. In 1994, he founded MediBRIDGE, a medical information exchange platform. He was corporate chief information officer (CIO) of CMPMedica, a division of United Business media. In 2006, he became CEO of Custodix, a company specialized in data protection solutions for eHealth.
