= Militsa Nechkina =

Soviet historian (1901–1985)

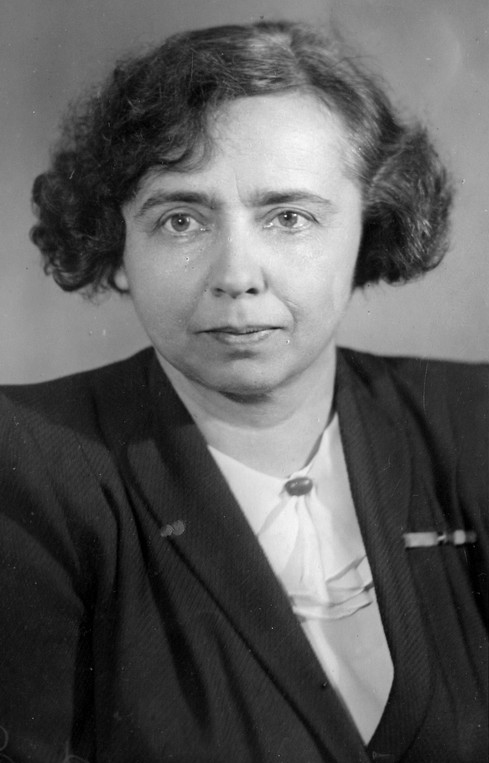
Nechkina in 1947

Militsa Vasilyevna Nechkina (Russian: Милица Васильевна Нечкина; 24 February 1899 – 16 May 1985) was a Soviet historian. She taught at Moscow State University and extensively studied the Decembrist revolt of 1825.

== Biography ==
Nechkina was born in Nizhyn, Russian Empire (modern-day Ukraine). She attended Kazan University, graduating in 1921. She began teaching history at Moscow State University in 1924 and became a doctor of historical sciences in 1936. She specialized in the study of the Decembrist revolt and was the first historian to write in detail about the social and ideological aspects of the revolt. As a historian, she also contributed to Soviet history topics in the Great Soviet Encyclopedia.

During World War II, Nechkina was one of the Soviet historians who responded to the war by telling stories of historical Russian victories. She wrote articles for the press and often visited soldiers in hospitals and academies to tell them stories she believed would boost morale. Nechkina was particularly conflicted on how to describe the 1812 French invasion of Russia, which resulted in the fire of Moscow. While she initially supported the historical consensus that the fire was started by Russian forces as part of a scorched earth strategy against the French invasion of Russia, by 1954 she wrote that it was caused by French forces.

Nechkina was friends with fellow historian Natan Eidelman and worked with him on occasion. While reviewing his book about Decembrist revolutionary Michael Lunin, she chose not to criticize it for its sympathy to legalism and neoliberalism as an alternative to revolution, instead challenging it for its emphasis on individuals rather than societal aspects such as serfdom.

Nechkina died in Moscow on 16 May 1985.

== Awards and honors ==
- Order of the Red Banner of Labour (1945)
- Medal "For Valiant Labour in the Great Patriotic War 1941–1945" (1946)
- Medal "In Commemoration of the 800th Anniversary of Moscow" (1948)
- Stalin Prize, 2nd class (1948) – for the book "Griboyedov and Decembrists"
- Three Orders of Lenin (1953, 1971, 1981)
- Order of Friendship of Peoples (1975)
