= Diffuse myelinoclastic sclerosis =

- Other names: Dms
- Specialty: Neurology

Diffuse myelinoclastic sclerosis, sometimes referred to as Schilder's disease, is a very infrequent neurodegenerative disease that presents clinically as pseudotumoural demyelinating lesions, making its diagnosis difficult. It usually begins in childhood, affecting children between 5 and 14 years old, but cases in adults are also possible.

This disease is considered one of the borderline forms of multiple sclerosis because some authors consider them different diseases and others MS variants. Other diseases in this group are neuromyelitis optica (NMO), Balo concentric sclerosis and Marburg multiple sclerosis.

== Symptoms and signs ==
Symptoms are similar to those in multiple sclerosis and may include dementia, aphasia, seizures, personality changes, poor attention, tremors, balance instability, incontinence, muscle weakness, headache, vomiting, and vision and speech impairment. Other symptoms include weakness on one side of the body, muscle stiffness, hearing problems, and loss of bowel control.

== Diagnostic ==
The Poser criteria for diagnosis are:

- One or two roughly symmetrical large plaques. Plaques are greater than 2 cm diameter.
- No other lesions are present and there are no abnormalities of the peripheral nervous system.
- Results of adrenal function studies and serum very long chain fatty acids are normal.
- Pathological analysis is consistent with subacute or chronic myelinoclastic diffuse sclerosis.

=== Neuropathological examination ===
The typical demyelinating plaques in Schilder's sclerosis are usually found bilaterally in the centrum semiovale. Both hemispheres are almost completely occupied by large, well defined lesions. Although plaques of this kind are largely prevalent in Schilder's sclerosis, smaller lesions can also be observed.

=== Immunology ===
It has been reported that DMS cases show no oligoclonal bands, being therefore distinct from standard MS.

== Treatments ==
Management: Corticosteroids may be effective in some patients. Additional treatment options are beta-interferon or immunosuppressive therapy. Otherwise management is supportive and includes physiotherapy, occupational therapy and nutritional support in the later stages as patients lose their ability to eat.

== Prognosis ==
The prognosis of this disease is very variable and can take three different courses: a monophasic, not remitting; remitting; and finally, progressive, with increase in deficits.

== History ==
It was first described by Paul Ferdinand Schilder in 1912, and for nearly one hundred years the term "Schilder disease" was used to describe it, but the same name was also used for some other white matter pathologies described by him. In 1986 Poser tried to restrict the use of Schilder's disease name to the disease described here, but this name has still remained ambiguous.

The name comes from a traditional classification of demyelinating diseases in two groups: demyelinating myelinoclastic diseases and demyelinating leukodystrophic diseases. In the first group, a normal and healthy myelin is destroyed by a toxic, chemical, or autoimmune substance. In the second group, myelin is abnormal and degenerates. The second group was denominated dysmyelinating diseases by Poser.
