= Paul Ferdinand Schilder =

Austrian neurologist and psychiatrist

Paul Ferdinand Schilder (February 15, 1886, Vienna – December 7, 1940, New York City) was an Austrian psychiatrist, psychoanalyst, and medical researcher.

Schilder's research work in both neurophysiology and neuropathology, coupled with an active interest in philosophy, led to his involvement in psychoanalysis. He became a member of the Vienna Psychoanalytic Society founded by Sigmund Freud, although he never underwent analysis himself. He deviated from accepted psychoanalytic doctrine (especially regarding the existence of a death drive) and published his own ideas. He started the integration of psychoanalytic theory into psychiatry, and he is considered one of the founding fathers of group psychotherapy. He also introduced the concept of the body image, which has proved a lasting contribution to psychological and medical thinking. He was a prolific author on a range of subjects.

As a biomedical researcher, he worked on the description of several conditions that were named after him (for example, the term 'Schilder's disease' can refer to a rare variant of multiple sclerosis also known as diffuse myelinoclastic sclerosis).

== Life and work ==
Schilder was the son of a Jewish silk merchant. He received his doctorate in medicine in 1909 from the University of Vienna and, as a result of his work Self-Esteem and Personality, received his doctorate of philosophy in 1917. Between the years of 1912 and 1914 he worked as a doctor's assistant as the psychiatric clinic in Leipzig. He also served in various hospitals during the first world war. In 1918 he came to the psychiatric clinic in Vienna, and in 1920 began working towards a professorship in neurology and psychiatry.

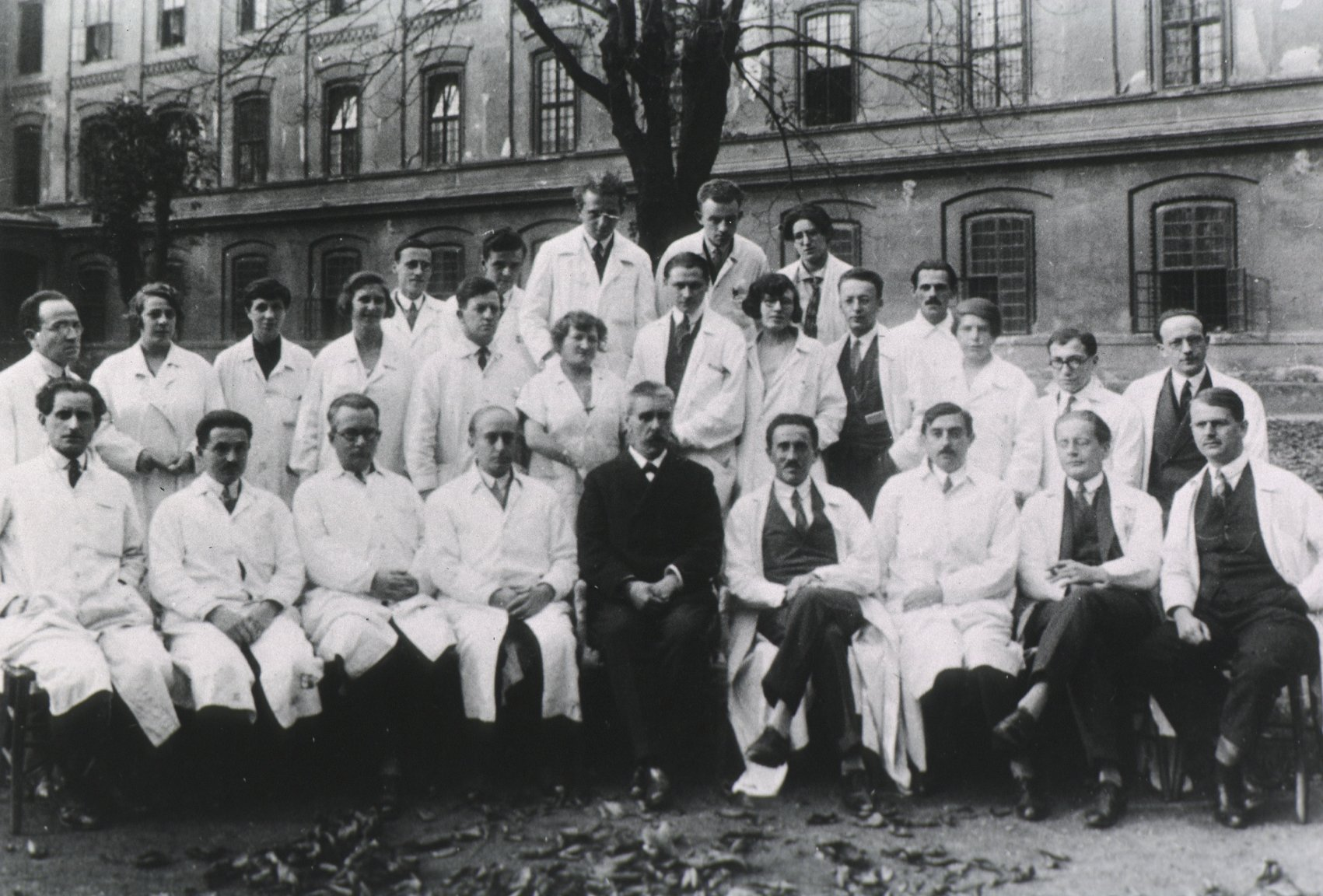
Julius Wagner-Jauregg's staff in 1927; Schilder in front row, third figure from the right

In 1919 Schilder became a member of the Viennese Psychoanalytical Association (WPV). Schilder was promoted to professor in 1925, and in the same year he released his Abstract for psychiatry based on the principles of psychoanalysis. Because of his analytic commitments the academic establishment became increasingly hostile towards Schilder, and in 1928 he left the clinic and traveled to Baltimore where he became a guest lecturer for a semester at Johns Hopkins University.

In 1929 Schilder undertook a lead role for the treatment of outpatients with psychoses for the WPV. In the same year, however, he relocated to New York. He taught at the New York University and was also appointed clinical director at Bellevue Hospital. With his second wife, Lauretta Bender, he worked with psychotic children, with whom he implemented group therapy. He also published approximately 300 scientific works on varying topics of interest. In December 1940, after he had visited his wife and newborn daughter at the clinic, he was killed in a car accident.

== Contributions ==
=== Body work ===
Schilder combined Carl Wernicke's concept of the somatopsychic, Sir Henry Head's postural model of the body, and Freud's idea that the ego is primarily a body ego, to arrive to his own formulation of the fundamental role of the body image in man's relation to himself, to his fellow human beings, and to the world around him. Over the years, Schilder wrote a number of papers developing these formulations, culminating in his book The Image and Appearance of the Human Body, published in 1935, which he esteemed highest among his later works."

Schilder argued that everyone had a (potentially infinite) number of separate body-images. He also explored the role of changes in body image in schizophrenia, with especial reference to feelings of depersonalization.

The considerations and conclusions in his publications were the result of a carefully thorough analysis of practically just a few of his own cases, including histological-neuropathological tests, as well as a systematic and critical study of the related specialist literature. In particular, he sought to distinguish his encephalitis periaxialis diffusa from the diffuse sc of gliomas, MS and Heubner's disease.

=== Analytic views ===
Schilder was recognized as an unorthodox analyst. He was an opponent of the obligatory and growing training analysis and had a divergent opinion in relation to drive theory and the unconscious. His philosophical rudiments were influenced by the phenomenology of Edmund Husserl and his psychological works influenced by Karl Bühler. Freud himself clashed fiercely with Schilder over the question of training analyses, writing to him in 1935 that those of the first analytic generation who weren't analysed did not boast of the fact, and that "whenever it was possible it was done: Jones and Ferenczi, for instance, had long analyses".

=== Space ===
Schilder wrote a series of articles in the thirties on the psychoanalysis of space, time and geometry, later subsumed into chapters of his 1942 book Mind.

=== Group work ===
Schilder is also considered one of the founding fathers of group therapy. He began using analytic and exploratory use of groups in both hospital and out-patient settings, as well as treating severely neurotic and mildly psychotic out-patients in small groups at Bellevue.

Otto Fenichel expressed doubts as to "whether the authors who, like Schilder, believed in purely psychoanalytic effects in group therapy were not in error about what they themselves were doing".

=== Disease identification ===
He worked on delineating several diseases that now carry his name:

- Addison-Schilder syndrome, Schilder-Addison Complex or Adrenoleukodystrophy
- Schilder's disease or diffuse myelinoclastic sclerosis, a variant of multiple sclerosis
- Schilder-Foix disease
- Schilder-Stengel syndrome

== See also ==
- Eugene Minkowski
- Gestalt psychology
- Trigant Burrow
