= Nikolay Shilder =

Russian painter (1828–1898)

- Николай Густавович Шильдер
- Born: 12 March 1828; Kharkiv
- Died: 13 March 1898 (aged 70)
- Education: Member Academy of Arts (1861)
- Alma mater: Imperial Academy of Arts (1860)
- Known for: Painting

Nikolay Gustavovich Shilder (also: Nikolai Schilder, Russian: Николай Густавович Шильдер; 1828 - 25 March [O.S. 13 March] 1898, Saint-Petersburg) was a Russian painter, active in St. Petersburg during Tsars Alexander II and Alexander III's reigns, once known for his genre pictures.

== Biography ==
Schilder was born to a Baltic German father. He graduated from the Imperial Academy of Arts in Saint Petersburg. He became an academician of the Academy in 1861. Under the influence of Pavel Fedotov he painted a series of paintings devoted to the life of ordinary people (genre painting). He also painted ceremonial portraits, including the portrait of tsar Alexander III of Russia.

His son, Andrey Shilder, was also a painter, mostly known for his landscape art.

== Works ==
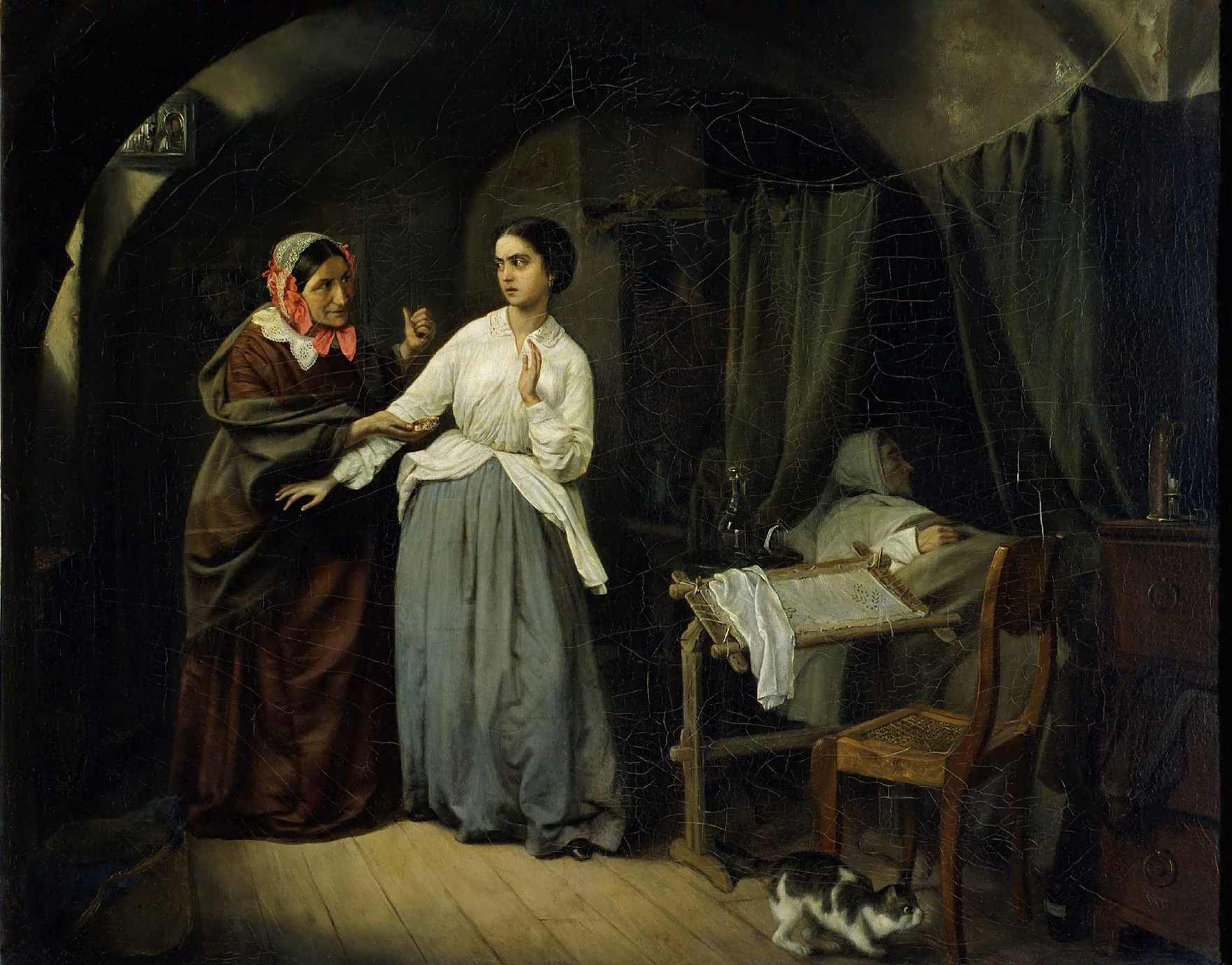
The Temptation (1857)

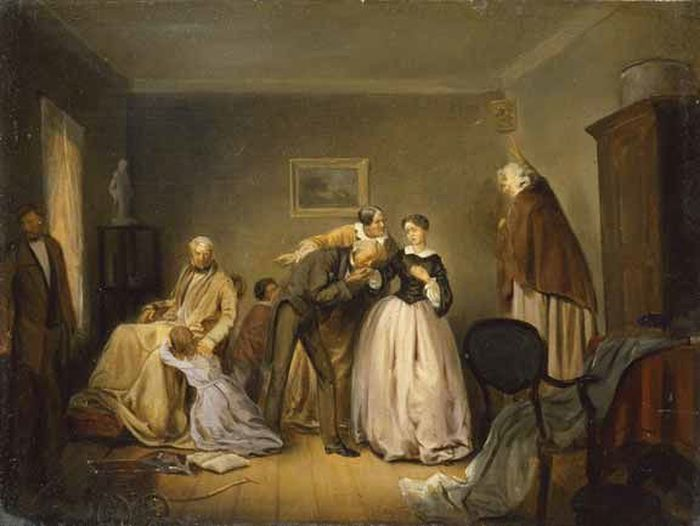
Wedding Arrangement (1859)

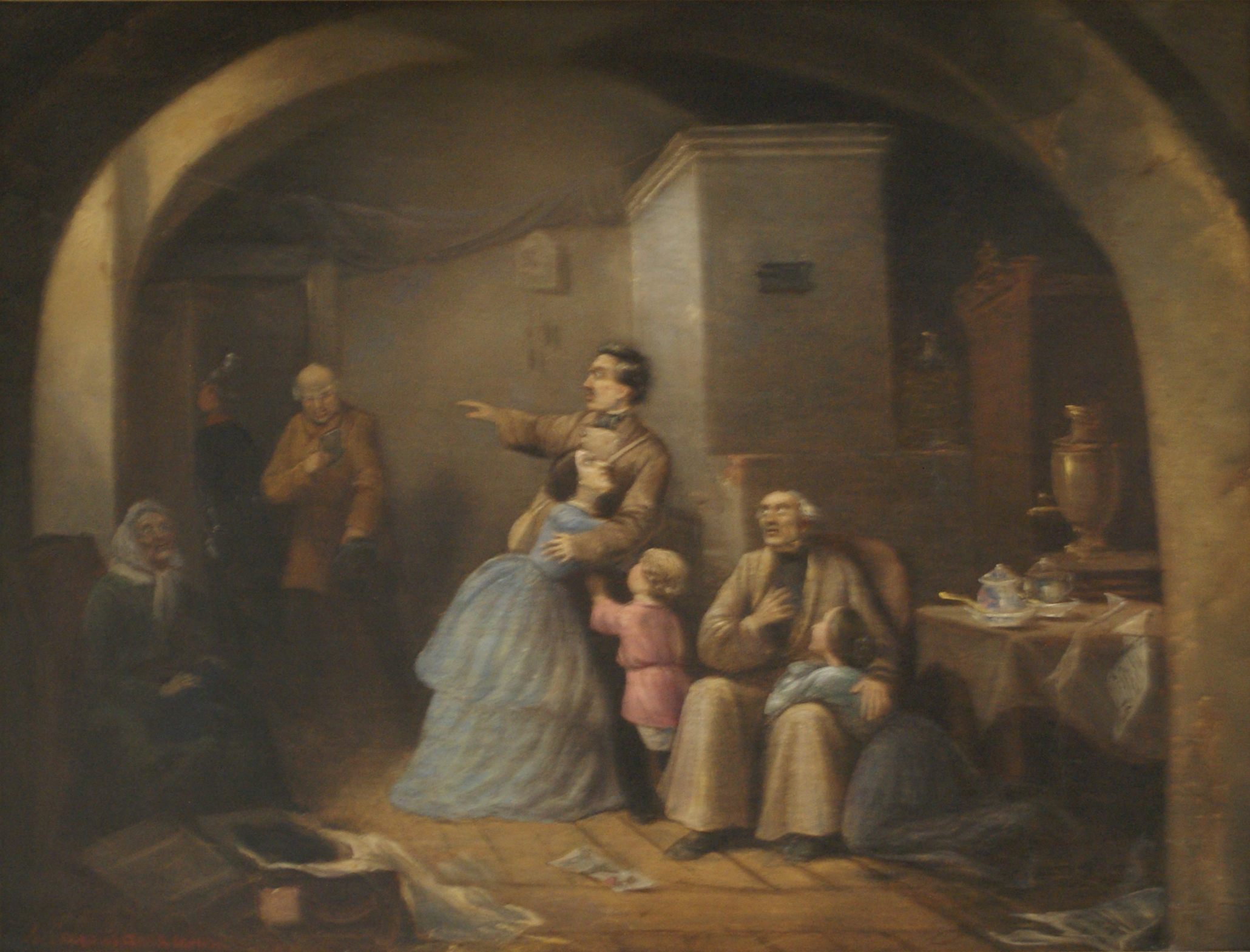
A Settlement with the Creditors

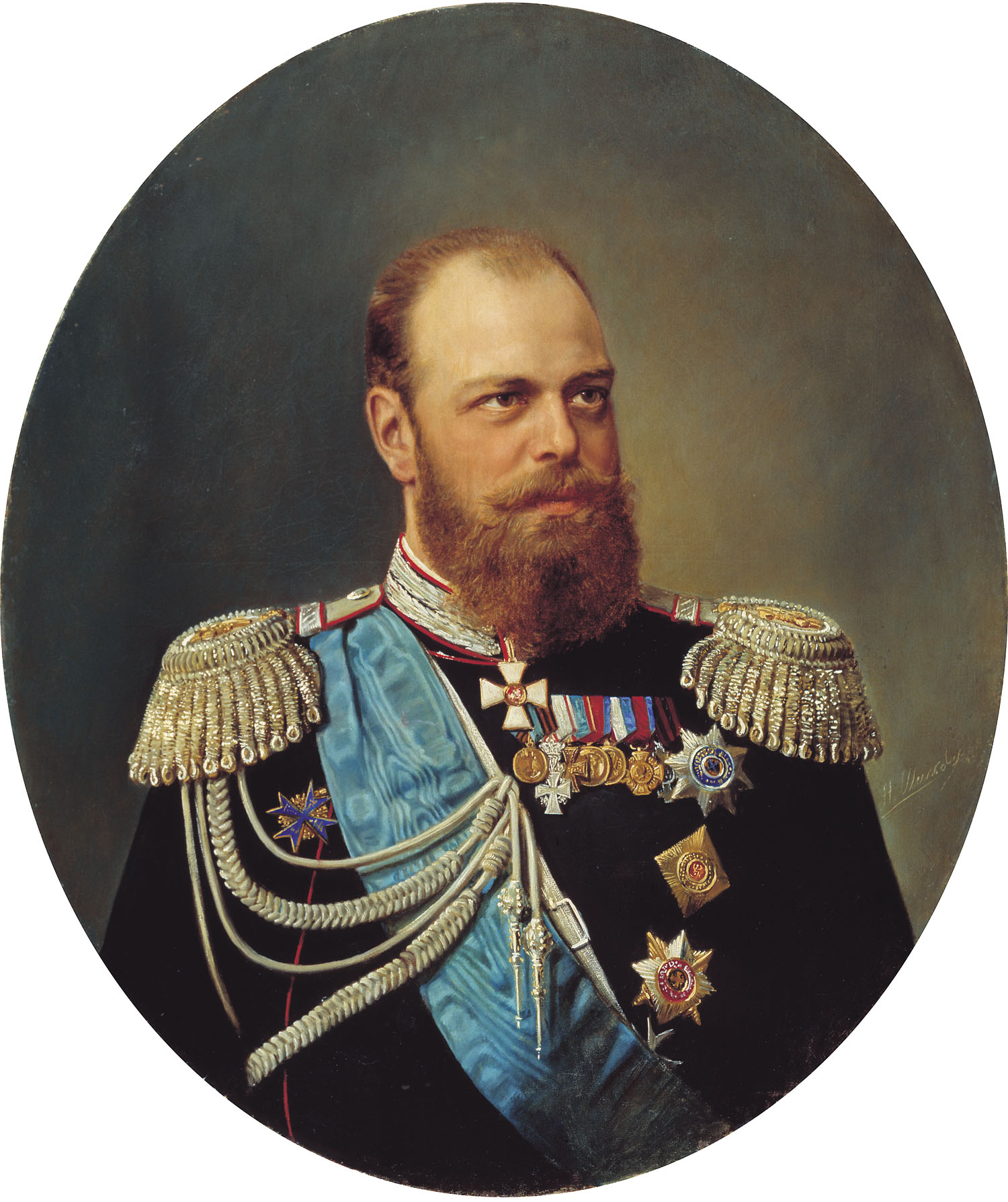
Alexander III

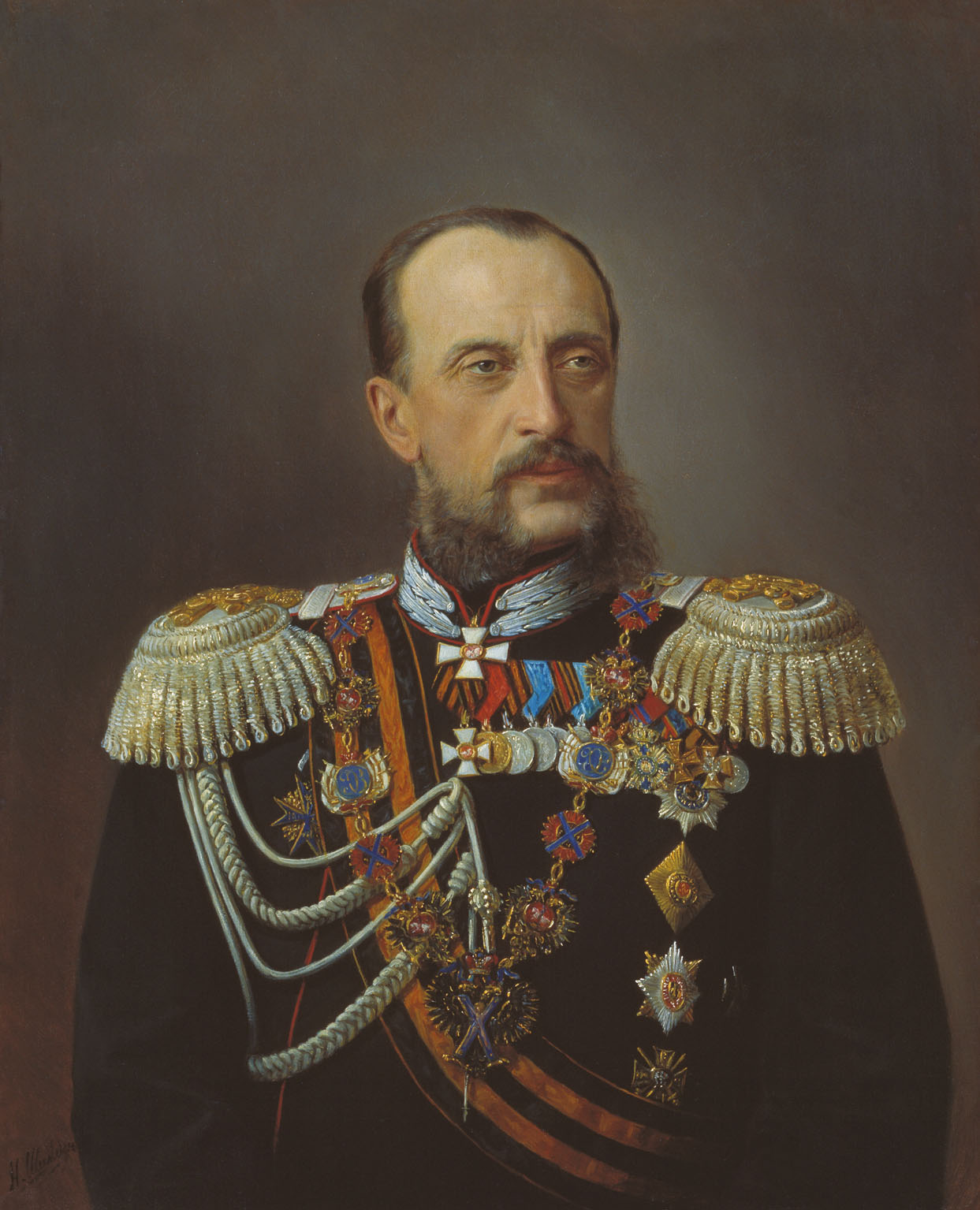
Grand Duke Nicholas Nikolaevich

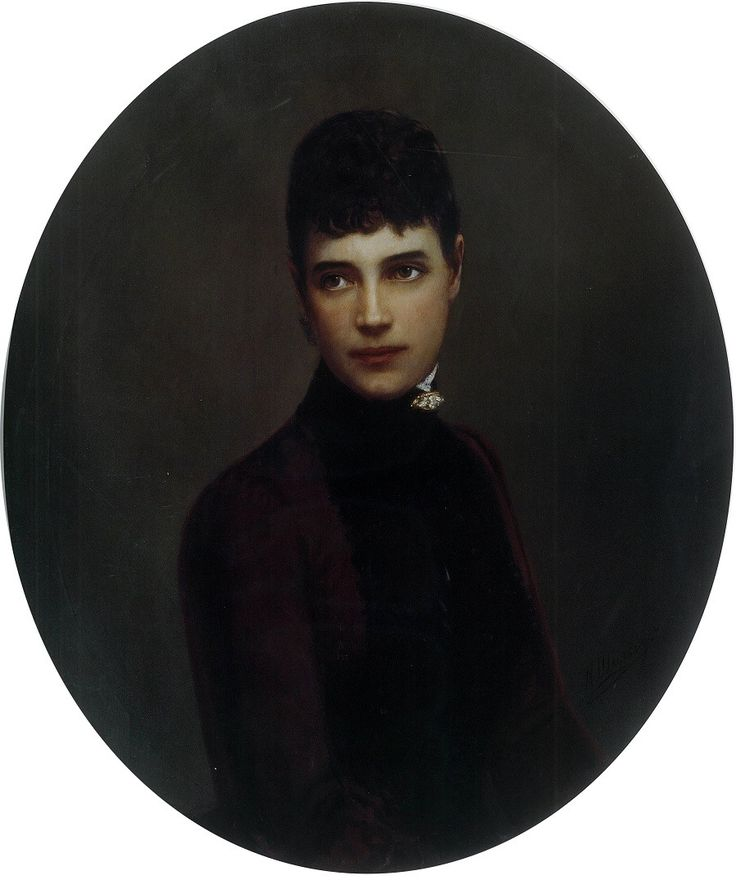
Maria Feodorovna (Dagmar of Denmark)
- Farewell of the Militiamen (Russian: Прощание ополченцев, 1855) is a painting on the occasion of the Crimean War. Its original is at the Russian Museum, St. Petersbur
- The Temptation (Russian: Искушение, 1857) It was the first Shilder's work in the style then called "painting of folk scenes" (Russian: живопись народных сцен) or de genre (genre painting). Originally it was thought that was bought by Pavel Tretyakov in 1856, as one or the first items of his collection (together with Vasily Khudyakov's A Skirmish with Finnish Smugglers), which later turned into the Tretyakov Gallery, but more recently it was concluded that the painting was completed in 1857 and sold in 1858. A possible explanation of the discrepancy in dates is that Tretyakov possibly saw a sketch and paid in advance.
- Wedding Arrangement (Russian: Сговор невесты, 1859) is a painting Schilder prepared for the academic exhibition of 1860. The whereabouts of the original are unknown and its sketch is at the Russian Museum, St. Petersburg. The painting was also known under the title Forced Marriage (Насильный брак).
- Money Lender (Russian: Ростовщик, 1859); its sketch is at the Russian Museum, St. Petersburg.
- A Settlement with the Creditors (Расплата с кредиторами») In 1861, this painting earned Schilder the title of Academician of Genre and Battle Painting. Fyodor Dostoyevsky described it as having "a very strong melodrama feel", with its an accidental denouement resembling a cheap vaudeville.

== Notes ==
Full quotation of Dostoyevsky about A Settlement with the Creditors

Расплата с кредиторами очень сильно отзывается мелодрамой, а по случайности своей напоминает водевили средней руки, в которых развязка наступает не в силу естественного хода обстоятельств, а совершенно случайно. Герой этого водевиля, молодой человек прекрасной наружности, только что приехал в ту минуту, когда кредитор явился за получением денег по векселю. Должник, больной старик, сидит в креслах и сам себя не помнит от радости. На полу лежит разорванный вексель, тут же только что раскрытый чемодан, из которого, очевидно, вынуты деньги для расплаты. Герой, к которому в знак благодарности бросилась дочь старика, не обращая надлежащего внимания на ее сладостные объятия, грозно смотрит на кредитора, который ретируется к двери, аза ним Немезида в виде квартального надзирателя. Есть еще несколько лиц: жена, дети; обстановка бедная, но героиня, девица, в довольно богатом платье. И представляется зрителю всё, что за сим следует: дочь, благодарная за спасение отца от тюрьмы или от описи имения, выходит за освободителя и надлежащим образом любит великодушного своего мужа; впоследствии старик весело умирает, попировав на крестинах своих внучат, и так далее, впредь до будущих подобных сцен, когда нынешний освободитель, тоже больной и дряхлый, будет сидеть на креслах и будет сильно нуждаться в освободителе, и такового не окажется так кстати, как теперь, потому что до такой степени кстати случается это только в водевилях.

A Settlement with the Creditors has a strong melodrama quality, and its randomness recalls those low-grade vaudevilles, in which the denouement occurs not through the natural course of events, but entirely by chance. The hero of this vaudeville, a handsome young man, has just arrived at the moment when the creditor comes to collect. The debtor, a sick old man, is sitting in a chair, overwhelmed with joy. The torn promissory note lies on the floor, and nearby is an opened suitcase, from which the money for the settlement has obviously been taken. The hero, to whom the old man's daughter has rushed in gratitude, paying no due attention to her sweet embrace, glares menacingly at the creditor, who retreats to the door, followed by Nemesis in the guise of a police officer. There are several other characters: the wife and children; the furnishings are poor, but the heroine, a young woman, is dressed rather richly. And the spectator may imagine everything that will follow: the daughter, grateful for saving her father from prison or from the seizure of his estate, marries the liberator and loves her magnanimous husband in the proper way; later, the old man dies happily, having feasted at the christening of his grandchildren, and so on, until similar future scenes, when the current liberator, also ill and decrepit, will sit in an armchair and will be in great need of a liberator, and one will not turn up so luckily as now, because such luck only happens in vaudeville.

== Literary sources ==
- С. Н. Кондаков (1915). Юбилейный справочник Императорской Академии художеств. 1764-1914 (in Russian). Vol. 2. p. 224.
