= Pathology of multiple sclerosis =

Pathologic overview

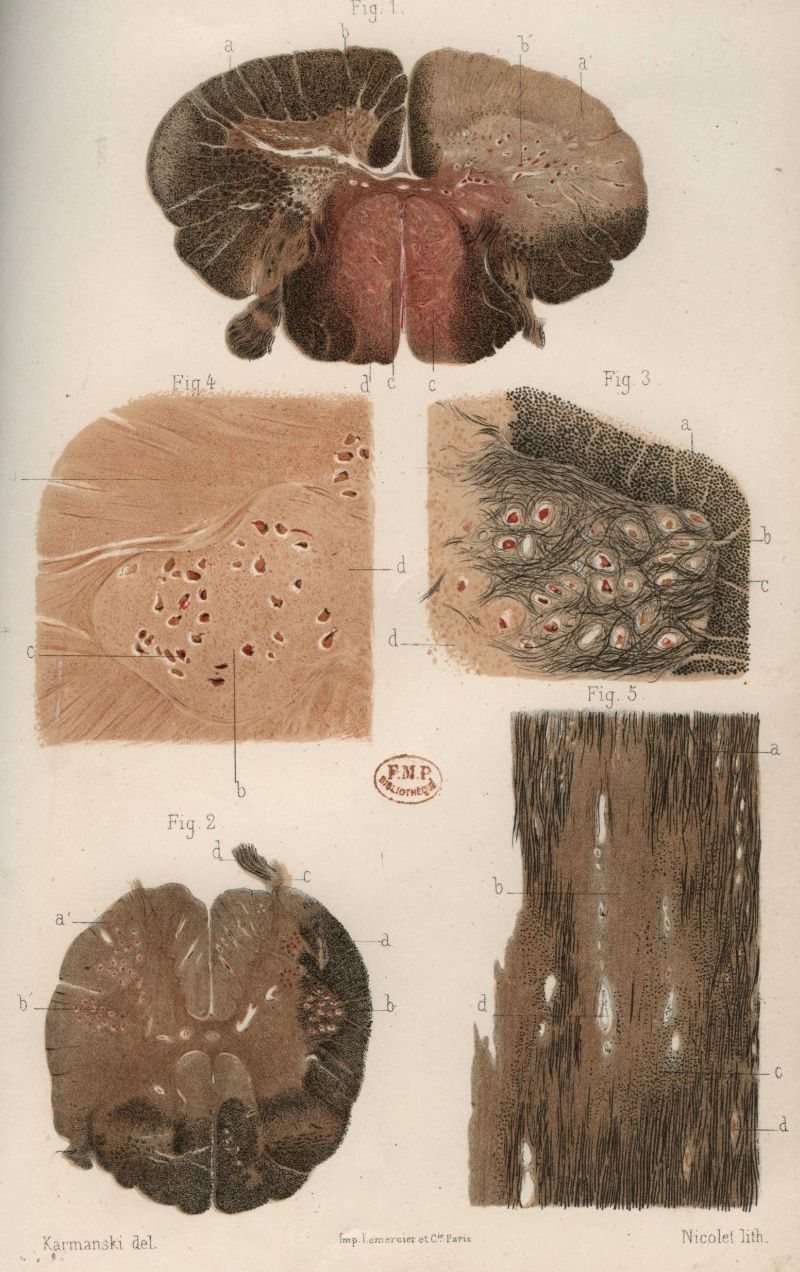
Drawing of sclerotic lesions from Babinski's thesis "Etude anatomique et clinique de la sclérose en plaques", 1885

Multiple sclerosis (MS) can be pathologically defined as the presence of distributed glial scars (scleroses) in the central nervous system that must show dissemination in time (DIT) and in space (DIS) to be considered MS lesions.

The scars that give the name to the condition are produced by the astrocyte cells attempting to heal old lesions. These glial scars are the remnants of previous demyelinating inflammatory lesions (encephalomyelitis disseminata) which are produced by the one or more unknown underlying processes that are characteristic of MS.

Apart from the disseminated lesions that define the condition, the CNS white matter normally shows other kinds of damage. At least five characteristics are present in CNS tissues of MS patients: Inflammation beyond classical white matter lesions (NAWM, normal-appearing white matter and NAGM, normal-appearing gray matter), intrathecal Ig production with oligoclonal bands, an environment fostering immune cell persistence, Follicle-like aggregates in the meninges (B-cells mostly infected with EBV) and a disruption of the blood–brain barrier even outside of active lesions.

Confluent subpial cortical lesions are the most specific finding for MS, being exclusively present in MS patients. Though this feature can only be detected during an autopsy there are some subrogate markers under study Damage in MS consists also in areas with hidden damage (normal appearing white and gray matters) and two kinds of cortical lesions: Neuronal loss and cortical demyelinating lesions. The neural loss is the result of neural degeneration from lesions located in the white matter areas and the cortical demyelinating lesions are related to meningeal inflammation.

The scars in the white matter are known to appear from confluence of smaller ones

Currently the term "multiple sclerosis" is ambiguous and refers not only to the presence of the scars, but also to the unknown underlying condition that produces these scars. Besides clinical diagnosis uses also the term "multiple sclerosis" for speaking about the related clinical courses. Therefore, when referring to the presence of the scars is better to use the equivalent term astrocytic fibrillary gliosis.

== Lesions consistent with MS ==
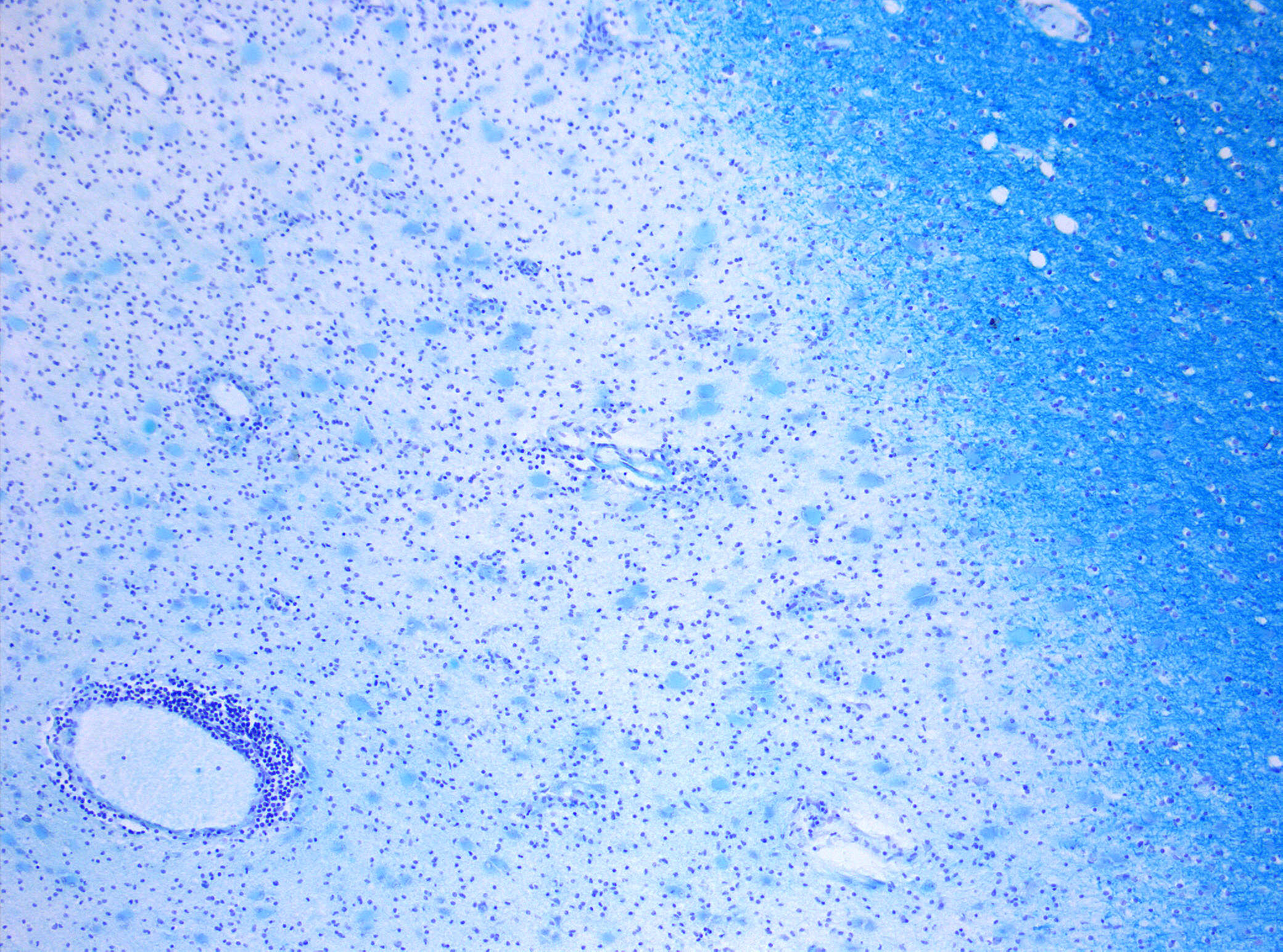
Demyelinization by MS. The Klüver-Barrera colored tissue show a clear decoloration in the area of the lesion (Original scale 1:100)

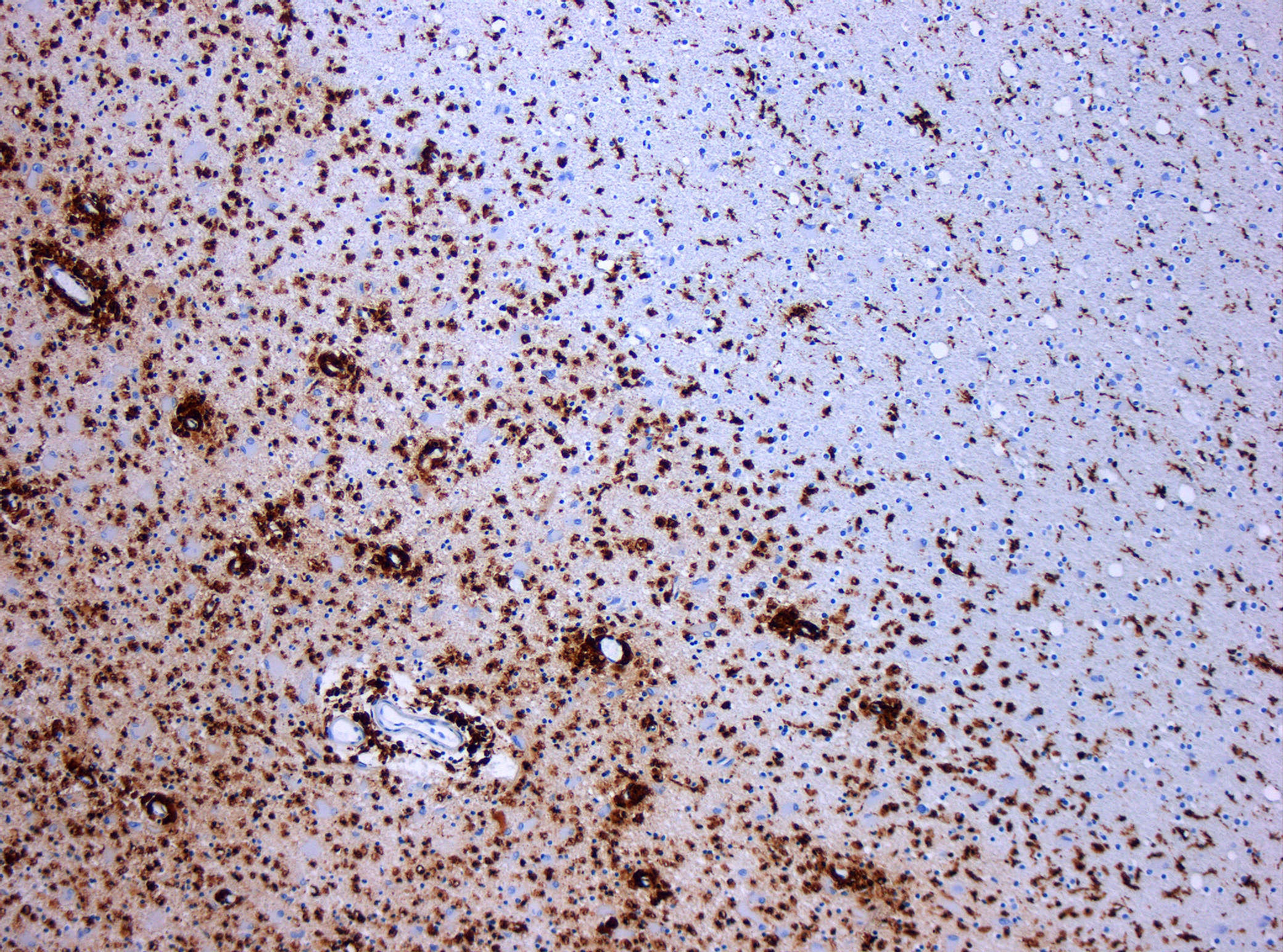
Demyelinization by MS. The CD68 colored tissue shows several Macrophages in the area of the lesion. Original scale 1:100

A combination of histologic and/or immunohistochemical stains can be used to visualize post-mortem MS characteristic lesions and to diagnose post-mortem "inflammatory demyelinating lesions consistent with MS":

- hematoxylin and eosin stain (demonstrates tissue and cell morphology)
- myelin stains (Luxol fast blue/periodic acid-Schiff, Luxol fast blue/hematoxylin/eosin, or immunohistochemistry for myelin proteins)
- macrophage-specific markers (immunohistochemistry for KiM1P or CD68)
- stains for axons (Bielschowsky silver impregnation or immunohistochemistry for neurofilament protein)
- stains for astrocytes (hematoxylin and eosin or immunohistochemistry for glial fibrillary acidic protein) and
- stains for the different lymphocyte subtypes (immunohistochemistry for CD3, CD4, CD8, CD20, and/or CD138)

These markers are specific for the different processes that drive the formation of plaques: inflammation, myelin breakdown, astrogliosis, oligodendrocyte injury, neurodegeneration, axonal loss and remyelination. MS lesions evolve differently during early versus chronic disease phases, and within each phase, different kind of activity appears.

The classification system for the lesions was updated in 2017. This system classifies MS lesions as active, mixed active/inactive, or inactive lesions based on the presence and distribution of macrophages/microglia. They locate the slowly expanding lesions inside the mixed subtype and provide a description of the different lesion types and required staining techniques.

To consider some lesions as a case of MS, even under autopsy, they must be disseminated in time and space. Dissemination in time can be shown by the stage of the lesion evolution. If only a lesion is present it could be a case of solitary sclerosis.

MS is usually defined as the presence of disseminated lesions in space and time with no other explanation for them. Therefore, given the unspecificity of the lesions, several MS pathological underlying conditions have been found, which are now considered separate diseases. There are at least three kind of lesions that were historically considered inside the MS spectrum and now are considered as separate entities:

- Anti-AQP4 disease
- Anti-MOG disease
- Anti-Neurofascin disease

== Demyelination process ==
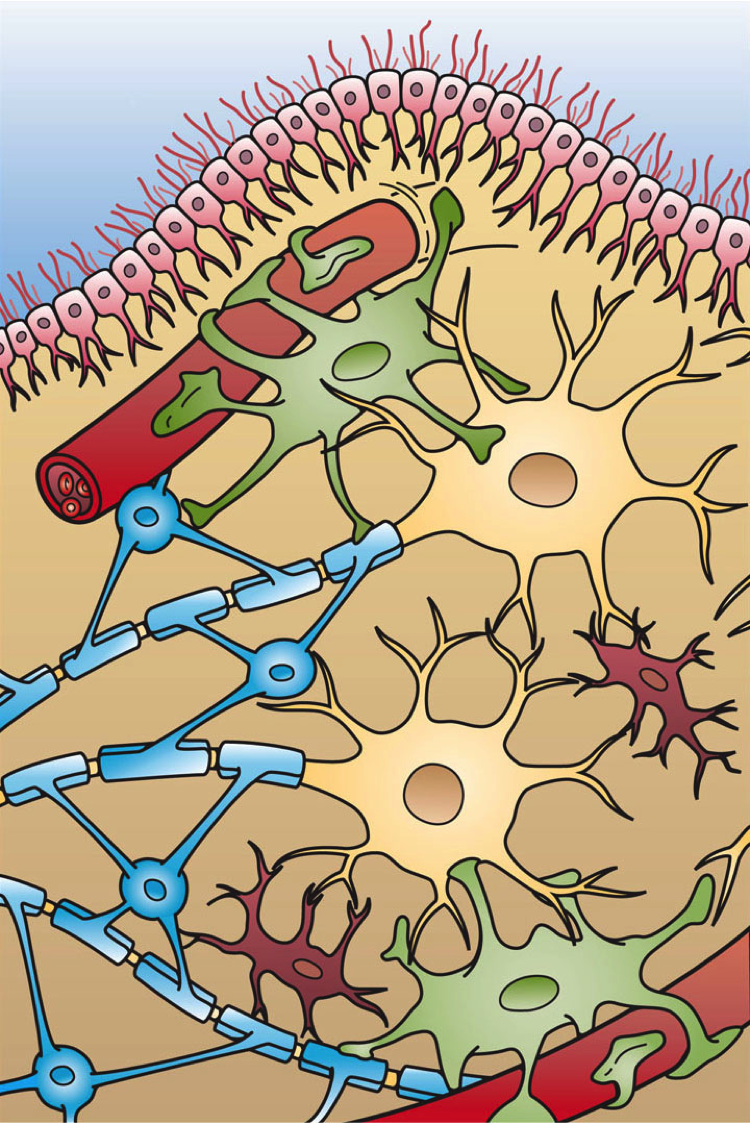
Illustration of the four different types of glial cells found in the central nervous system: ependymal cells, astrocytes, microglial cells, and oligodendrocytes.

Lesions in MS are heterogeneous and there are four different patterns in which they start, probably due to different underlying pathogenesis. Nevertheless, it seems than the last stage of damage is similar for all of them. Traditionally it was thought that MS lesions were produced by CD4+ T-cells but after the discovery of anti-MOG and anti-NF demyelinating diseases, it has been noticed that most CD4+ cases are anti-MOG in reality, and now CD8+ cases are considered the real MS cases.

In some cases (pattern II), a special subset of lymphocytes, called T helper cells or "CD4+ T-cells" play a key role in the development of the lesion in a way similar to the CD4+ attacks that appear in anti-MOG associated encephalomyelitis.

In the standard cases, the trigger and the underlying condition of MS is a soluble factor produced by CD8+ T-cells (or maybe B-cells). Also B Cells have been implicated in the pathogenesis of MS, and some theoretical models link the presence of EBV-infected B-cells to the development of MS.

The first stage of a MS lesion is thought to be the development of an area called "normal appearing white matter" (NAWM). In this area activated microglia appears, as shown by positron emission tomography. MS lesions appear in these areas as pre-active lesions without autoimmune infiltrates at this stage They show microglia activation and degeneration of the neuron axons without T-cell infiltration. Both problems appear together though it is not known which one is first.

T-cells attack is followed by leaks in the blood–brain barrier where T-cells infiltrate causing the known demyelination.

=== HERVs and microglia ===
Human endogenous retroviruses (HERVs) have been reported in MS for several years. In fact, one of the families, Human Endogenous Retrovirus-W was first discovered while studying MS patients.

Recent research as of 2019 point to one of the HERV-W viruses (pHEV-W), and specifically one of the proteins of the viral capside that has been found to "activate microglia" in vitro. Activated microglia in turn produces demyelination. Some interactions between the Epstein-Barr virus and the HERVs could be the trigger of the MS microglia reactions.

=== Last stage damage ===
Regardless of which kind of trigger initiates the damage, the axons themselves and the oligodendrocytes. are finally damaged by the T-cell attacks. Often, the brain is able to compensate for some of this damage, due to an ability called neuroplasticity. MS symptoms develop as the cumulative result of multiple lesions in the brain and spinal cord. This is why symptoms can vary greatly between different individuals, depending on where their lesions occur.

Repair processes, called remyelination, also play an important role in MS. Remyelination is one of the reasons why, especially in early phases of the disease, symptoms tend to decrease or disappear temporarily. Nevertheless, nerve damage and irreversible loss of neurons occur early in MS.

The oligodendrocytes that originally formed a myelin sheath cannot completely rebuild a destroyed myelin sheath. However, the central nervous system can recruit oligodendrocyte stem cells capable of proliferation and migration and differentiation into mature myelinating oligodendrocytes. The newly formed myelin sheaths are thinner and often not as effective as the original ones. Repeated attacks lead to successively fewer effective remyelinations, until a scar-like plaque is built up around the damaged axons. These scars are the so-called "scleroses" that define the condition. They are named glial scars because they are produced by glial cells, mainly astrocytes, and their presence prevents remyelination. Therefore, there is research ongoing to prevent their formation.

Under laboratory conditions, stem cells are quite capable of proliferating and differentiating into remyelinating oligodendrocytes; it is therefore suspected that inflammatory conditions or axonal damage somehow inhibit stem cell proliferation and differentiation in affected areas

== Specific areas of damage ==
The unknown underlying condition produces inflammation, demyelination and atrophy in several areas. Some of the body tissues mentioned, like the retina, do not have myelin. In those cases, only inflammation and atrophy appears.

=== Brain lesions distribution ===
Main: Lesional demyelinations of the CNS

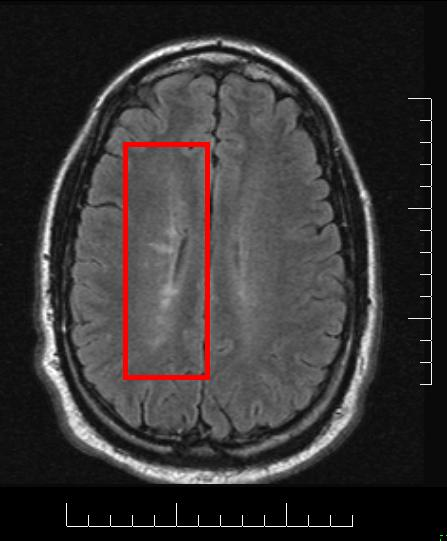
Dawson's Fingers appearing on an MRI scan

Multiple sclerosis is considered a disease of the white matter because normally lesions appear in this area, but it is also possible to find some of them in the grey matter.

Using high field MRI system, with several variants several areas show lesions, and can be spacially classified in infratentorial, callosal, juxtacortical, periventricular, and other white matter areas. Other authors simplify this in three regions: intracortical, mixed gray-white matter, and juxtacortical. Others classify them as hippocampal, cortical, and WM lesions, and finally, others give seven areas: intracortical, mixed white matter-gray matter, juxtacortical, deep gray matter, periventricular white matter, deep white matter, and infratentorial lesions. The distribution of the lesions could be linked to the clinical evolution

Post-mortem autopsy reveal that gray matter demyelination occurs in the motor cortex, cingulate gyrus, cerebellum, thalamus and spinal cord. Cortical lesions have been observed specially in people with SPMS but they also appear in RRMS and clinically isolated syndrome. They are more frequent in men than in women and they can partly explain cognitive deficits.

Regarding two parameters of the cortical lesions (CLs), fractional anisotropy (FA) is lower and mean diffusivity (MD) is higher in patients than in controls. The differences are larger in SPMS (secondary progressive multiple sclerosis) than in RRMS (relapsing-remitting multiple sclerosis) and most of them remain unchanged for short follow-up periods. They do not spread into the subcortical white matter and never show gadolinium enhancement. Over a one-year period, CLs can increase their number and size in a relevant proportion of MS patients, without spreading into the subcortical white matter or showing inflammatory features similar to those of white matter lesions.

Due to the distribution of the lesions, since 1916 they are also known as Dawson's fingers. They appear around the brain blood vessels.

=== Spinal cord damage ===
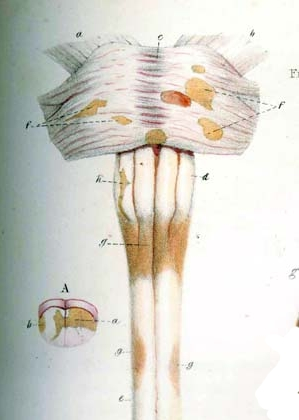
Detail of Carswell's drawing of MS lesions in the brain stem and spinal cord (1838)

Cervical spinal cord has been found to be affected by MS even without attacks, and damage correlates with disability. In RRMS, cervical spinal cord activity is enhanced, to compensate for the damage of other tissues. It has been shown that Fractional anisotropy of cervical spinal cord is lower than normal, showing that there is damage hidden from normal MRI.

Progressive tissue loss and injury occur in the cervical cord of MS patients. These two components of cord damage are not interrelated, suggesting that a multiparametric MRI approach is needed to get estimates of such a damage. MS cord pathology is independent of brain changes, develops at different rates according to disease phenotype, and is associated to medium-term disability accrual.

Spinal cord presents grey matter lesions, that can be confirmed post-mortem and by high field MR imaging. Spinal cord grey matter lesions may be detected on MRI more readily than GM lesions in the brain, making the cord a promising site to study the grey matter demyelination. Myelin Water Fraction (MWF) shows lesions under MRI

Several CSF markers reveal intrathecal inflammation in progressive MS (SPMS and PPMS)

=== Cerebellum and Thalamus ===
Cerebellar ataxia appears mainly in PPMS and it is related to the pathological changes in the cerebellum. Some special cells present only in the cerebellum, Purkinje cells, have been reported to be part of this problems. Increasing of neurofilament phosphorylation has been reported

Cerebellum is specially affected in progressive variants. Grey matter damage in the cerebellum is linked to inflammation in the subarachnoid space Though most of the cerebellum damage occurs in late stages, it can be seen that there are abnormalities since early disease stages mostly of the "Normal Appearing" kind

Thalamus degeneration in MS presents several features, such as trans-neuronal or Wallerian degeneration.

=== Cortex ===
Around 26% of MS lesions appear inside or adjacent to the cortex. It seems that in RRMS patients, both deep and cortical GM atrophy are associated with pathology in connected white matter. Cortical lesions are inflammatory (immune mediated) and can present relapses

Cortex lesions are disposed around the principal cortical veins and the majority enter the terrain of the white matter, and have been classified into seven types

Some research groups have proposed that cortical lesions are the origin of the NAWM areas in the white matter and 7-tesla scanners seem to confirm this hypothesis, showing that cortical pathology starts in the pial surface (external layer of the brain), which is in contact with the CSF, and extends later into the brain inner layers.

Lesions in the cortex have been classified by the area they affect into four groups: type I (leukocortical), type II (intracortical), type III (subpial), and type IV (subpial extending through the whole cortical width but not to subcortical WM). This classification is not related to the white matter lesions classification.

==== Normal appearing cortex ====
As with Normal appearing white matter (NAWM) and gray matter (NAGM), there is a Normal Appearing Cortex (NAC) in which no lesions have developed, but with abnormal microscopical properties. The NAC shows extensive RNA oxidation.

Recently it has been found that Normal Appearing Cortex presents primary neurodegenerative damage in the dendritic spines of the neurons, with no demyelination nor autoimmune infiltrates. For some authors this constitutes a proof to state that MS is a primary neurodegenerative condition.

==== Motor cortex ====
fibrinogen is deposited in MS motor cortex and associates with neurodegeneration.

=== Olfactory bulb ===
The olfactory nerve, similar to the optic nerve, is part of the Central Nervous System. This nerve terminates in the olfactory bulb, which also belongs to the central nervous system. Both develop from the CNS embrion, and recently it has been shown, by autopsies, that they are affected by the same diseases than the rest of the CNS. In particular, they are damaged during the multiple sclerosis course.

Related to this, the CSF of patients with disease activity show high levels of "Lateral Olfactory Tract Usher Substance" (LOTUS)

=== Retina and optic nerve damage ===
The eye's retina in MS is also damaged. Given that retina cells have no myelin, damage must be different from the autoimmune attack of the brain. The underlying condition in the retina produces pure neurodegeneration.

The retina and the optic nerve originate as outgrowths of the brain during embryonic development, so they are considered part of the central nervous system (CNS). It is the only part of the CNS that can be imaged non-invasively in the living organism. The retina nerve fiber layer (RNFL) is thinner than normal in MS patients

The procedure by which the MS underlying condition attacks the retina is currently unknown, but seems mediated by human leukocyte antigen-DR positive cells with the phenotype of microglia.

MS patients show axonal loss in the retina and optic nerve, which can be measured by Optical coherence tomography or by Scanning laser polarimetry. This measure can be used to predict disease activity and to establish a differential diagnosis from Neuromyelitis optica

About antibodies in the retina, tissue-bound IgG was demonstrated on retinal ganglion cells in six of seven multiple sclerosis cases but not in controls. Two eye problems, Uveitis and retinal phlebitis are manifestations of MS.

Proposed procedures for the neurodegeneration are than Narrower arterioles and wider venules have been reported. Also rigidity has been noticed

==== Degenerative process in the optic nerve and retina ====
Human retina is devoid of myelin, but inflammation is prominent in MS even at late stages of disease, showing prominent gliosis and inflammation surrounding the vessels of the inner retina.

Some results suggest the presence of trans-synaptic degeneration as a contributor to chronic axon damage in the optic nerve and retina Nevertheless, the authors of the paper were unable to identify whether the degeneration condition spreads from the anterior part or from the rear.

The optic radiation (OR), which is a set of axons that lead to the visual cortex, is more similar to the rest of the brain because it contains myelin. It is also damaged. In this area NAWM areas (see below) appear. The optic radiation damage is composed by two factors: trans-synaptic degeneration, and wallerian degeneration

Respect the theory about the role of the meninges in MS evolution, it is important to notice that the optic nerve in its intraorbital part has the tree meninges and it is tightly coupled with the pia mater.

=== Neural and axonal damage ===
Two different mechanisms of axon destruction are acting in MS. First of all, there is a diffuse axon degeneration, probably related to the NAWM appearance. Later, there is a second axonal damage mechanism localized in old demyelinating lesions, probably produced by B-Cells. This second damage is related to the T1-Hypointense lesions (MRI black holes) which appear when a demyelinating lesion is not remyelinated.

The axons of the neurons are damaged probably by B-Cells, though currently no relationship has been established with the relapses or the attacks. It seems that this damage is a primary target of the immune system, i.e. not secondary damage after attacks against myelin, though this has been disputed

Proton magnetic resonance spectroscopy has shown that there is widespread neuronal loss even at the onset of MS, largely unrelated to inflammation.

A relationship between neural damage and N-Acetyl-Aspartate concentration has been established, and this could lead to new methods for early MS diagnostic through magnetic resonance spectroscopy.

Axonal degeneration at CNS can be estimated by N-acetylaspartate to creatine (NAA/Cr) ratio, both measured by with proton magnetic resonance spectroscopy.

=== The meninges in multiple sclerosis ===
Drawing of the three meninges

The meninges are three layers that protect the brain and the spinal cord. They are called (from the outside to the inside) the dura mater, the arachnoid mater and the pia mater. The cerebrospinal fluid flows between the second and the third one. A remarkable finding in MS is that some Follicle-like aggregates appear in the meninges (composed by B-cells mostly infected with EBV). These aggregates grow during the disease process and is mostly found in secondary progressive patients.

Inflammation in the meninges has been found to be associated to gray mater (cortical) demyelination. Besides subpial demyelination suggest either a problem in the CSF or in the pia mater that should protect the cortex

Whatever the underlying condition for MS is, some damage is triggered by a CSF unknown soluble factor, which is produced in meningeal areas and diffuses into the cortical parenchyma. It destroys myelin either directly or indirectly through microglia activation.

The infiltration into meninges, which has been referred to as Tertiary Lymphoid Tissues (TLTs), prepares the infiltration into the CNS parenchyma causing demyelination in subpial and cortical areas. Animal models suggest that infiltrating Th17 cells remodel the meningeal stromal (non-immune) cells and initiate the formation of TLTs during EAE. The remodeled stromal cells retain and promote the production of Th17 and the accumulation of B cells. The collaboration between LTB on Th17 cells and LTBR (Lymphotoxin beta receptor) on meningeal radio-resistant cells is very crucial for the induction and progression of MS.

==== Meningeal tertiary lymphoid-like structures ====
Follicle-like aggregates in the meninges are formed only in secondary progressive MS. and correlate with the degree of subpial cortical demyelination and brain atrophy, suggesting that they might contribute to cortical pathology in SPMS

These ectopic lymphoid follicles are composed mainly of EBV infected B-cells.

=== Peripheral nervous system involvement ===
Though MS is defined as a CNS condition, some reports link problems in the peripheral nervous system with the presence of MS plaques in the CNS Currently, a new disease entity, combined central and peripheral demyelination has been defined as the simultaneous demyelination of the periferal and central nervous systems.

=== Lesion structure and evolution ===
Layers of a lesion

MS lesions mainly consist in demyelination and scarring in the fatty myelin sheaths around the axons of the brain and spinal cord.

Lesions evolve from the Normal Appearing White Matter. In MTR-MRI, the apparent diffusion coefficient (ADCav) is a measure of water molecule motion. It can be seen that before the BBB breakdown, this coefficient increases until, at some point, the blood-brain barrier breaks down and immune cells enter the brain producing the lesion.

According with the most recent (2009) research, an active lesion is composed of different layers:

- NAWM border with the lesion: These areas contained activated microglia, antibodies binding to astrocytes, axons, oligodendrocytes and dendritic cells along blood vessels. No T or B cells are present.
- Lesion external layer: Number of oligodendrocyte cell bodies decreases. Remaining oligodendrocytes are sometimes swollen or dying. Myelin sheaths are still intact but swollen. Small increase in microglia and T cells.
- Active layer: Phagocytic demyelinating areas: There is myelin debris taken up by local microglia and phagocytes entering from the bloodstream. More T cells in these areas, and in the space adjacent to blood vessels.
- Recently demyelinated tissue: Tissues were full of myelin-containing phagocytes. Signs of early remyelination together with small numbers of oligodendrocytes. Large numbers of T cells, B cells, and other immune cells concentrated around blood vessels.
- Inactive layer: Again activated microglia and dendritic cells were also found around blood vessels.

Some lesions named "slowly eroding lesions" or "slowly expanding" feature myelin phagocytosis at the lesion edge and evolve expanding across the white matter.

=== Lesions under MRI ===
Most MS lesions are isointense to white matter (they appear bright) on T1-weighted MRI, but some are "hypointense" (lower intensity). These are called "black holes" (BH). They appear specially in the supratentorial region of the brain.

When BH's appear, around half of them revert in a month. This is considered a sign of remyelination. When they remain, this is regarded as a sign of permanent demyelination and axonal loss. This has been shown on post-mortem autopsies.

Small lesions are invisible under MRI. Therefore, clinically assisted diagnostic criteria are still required for a more accurate MS diagnosis than MRI alone.

The lesion evolution under MRI has been reported to begin as a pattern of central hyperintensity. This was seen in the majority of new lesions, both on proton density and contrast-enhanced T1-weighted images. When gadolinium is used, the lesion expansion can be classified as nodular or ringlike.

Whatever the demyelination process is, currently it is possible to detect lesions before demyelination, and they show clusters of activated microglia and leukocyte infiltration, together with oligodendrocytes abnormalities. Some research groups consider some areas of the NAWM with clusters of microglial nodules as "preactive MS lesions". but their relevance is disputed.

Lesion evolution can be followed via MRI

== Damage before BBB disruption ==
=== Special MRI methods ===
Main Magnetic resonance imaging

The classic MRI methods are named T1-relaxation and T2-relaxation. They create the images based in the "relaxation time", i.e., the time it takes for a molecule to realign its magnetic with its environment after an electromagnetic pulse has taken it out of the equilibrium.

A third type of MRI is based in the water diffusivity. It is called "Diffusion MRI" or "Diffusion Tensor MRI". and the images produced are normally named Diffusion Tensor Images (DTI). A modification of the image post-processing is to account for the water density in each area. These are called "Diffusion Weighted Images" (DWI) or Diffusion Tensor MRI, DT-MRI. The diffusion measures the water response and the tensor structure takes account of the orientation of the tissue fibers. It is important because NAWM and NAGM show abnormal DT-MRI

A fourth important MRI technique is the Magnetization Transfer technique, MT-MRI. It measures differences in the Magnetization Transfer Ration (MTR). The idea is that the nucleus of any atom that has a net nuclear spin and that is bonded to a hydrogen atom could potentially be imaged via "heteronuclear magnetization transfer MRI". This would image the high-gyromagnetic-ratio hydrogen nucleus instead of the low-gyromagnetic-ratio nucleus that is bonded to the hydrogen atom. In principle, hetereonuclear magnetization transfer MRI could be used to detect the presence or absence of specific chemical bonds. NAWM and Diffusely abnormal areas (DAWM) appear under MT-MRI.

Finally, the fifth more important MRI technique is the Proton Magnetic resonance spectroscopy. Based in the different response to the electromagnetic pulses that different substances present, an MRS scanner is able to identify chemical substances in the brain. This is important because N‐acetylaspartate is a marker of axonal damage that can be now identified in-vivo.

=== Lesions under the special MRI methods ===
Normally two different kind of lesions appear on a normal MRI: T2-hypertense lesions and T1-hypointense. The first one are demyelinating lesions and appear brighter than the surroundings in T2-MRI.

The T1-hypointense are areas less dense than the surrounding NAW, and appear black on T1-MRI. They are mainly axonal degeneration areas. Because their black appearance they are sometimes known as black holes. They seem to appear as a sequel after a strong demyelinating lesion.

BBB disruption is normally shown using gadolinium. It is a contrast that cannot cross the BBB except when it is dysfunctional. Therefore, in active lesions with BBB implication the contrast enters the brain and appears in the MRI.

Before BBB disruption, some brain tissues which present normal aspect under T1 and T2 MRI (Normal appearing white matter, NAWM and normal appearing grey matter, NAGM), can show several abnormalities under special MRI technologies:

Magnetization transfer multi-echo T(2) relaxation. Subjects with Long-T(2) lesions had a significantly longer disease duration than subjects without this lesion subtype. It has been found that grey matter injury correlates with disability and that there is high oxidative stress in lesions, even in the old ones.

Diffusion tensor MRI or Magnetic Transfer MRI are two options to enhance MRI-hidden abnormalities discovery. This is currently an active field of research with no definitive results, but it seems that these two technologies are complementary.

Other methods of MRI allow us to get a better insight of the lesions structure. Recently MP-RAGE MRI has shown better results than PSIR and DIR for gray matter lesions. Susceptibility weighted imaging (SWI-MRI) has shown iron (hemosiderin) deposition in lesions, and helps to detect otherwise invisible lesions.

Abnormalities in the gray matter (Diffusion tensor MRI alterations) of the brain parenchyma are present early in the course of multiple sclerosis

== Normal appearing brain tissues ==
Using several texture analysis technologies, it is possible to classify white matter areas into three categories: normal, normal-appearing and lesions. Currently, it is possible to detect lesions before they present demyelination, and they are called pre-active lesions. A fourth area called DAWM (diffusely abnormal white matter) has been proposed and can help to differentiate PPMS and SPMS. Abundant extracellular myelin in the meninges of patients with multiple sclerosis has been found

Brain tissues with MRI-hidden problems are usually named Normal Appearing. Exploring the normal-appearing corpus callosum has been found a possible primary hypoperfusion, according with other findings in this same direction. Also iron (in hemosiderin deposits and as well as in ferritin-like structures inside the macrophage) accumulation has been reported

Several findings in these areas have been shown. Post-mortem studies over NAWM and NAGM areas (Normal appearing White and Gray Matters) show several biochemical alterations, like increased protein carbonylation and high levels of Glial fibrillary acidic protein (GFAP), which in NAGM areas comes together with higher than normal concentration of protein carbonyls, suggesting reduced levels of antioxidants and the presence of small lesions. The amount of interneuronal Parvalbumin is lower than normal in brain's motor cortex areas, and oxidative injury of oligodendrocytes and neurons could be associated with active demyelination and axonal injury.

NAWM in MS has been reported to be similar to NAWM in leukoaraiosis, though NAWM damage in MS is inflammatory and special microscopic techniques like CARS microscopy show that the CNS of MS patients may be globally altered, and both lesions and NAWM are just manifestations of another underlying problem. The NAWM is specially abnormal close to the ventricles, which may indicate a pathogenic mechanism mediated via the CSF or ependyma.

=== Non-lesional White Matter ===
Most of the brain in MS is unaffected. Though obviously normal white matter appears normal under MRI, so does the NAWM white matter described in the next section. To establish a difference, normal white matter is named Non-lesional white matter (NLWM)

This normal white matter is reported to be around 56% of the total WM of the patients.

=== Normal appearing White Matter ===
The white matter with hidden but MRI-visible damage is known as "Normal-appearing white matter" (NAWM) and is where lesions appear. The NAWM is considered a non-visible kind of lesion, produces disability and it is responsive to natalizumab

The pathology of the NAWM differs from areas near the lesions or near the cortex. Close to WM lesions, axonal pathology and microglial activation may explain subtle MRI changes. Distant from lesions, microglial activation associated with proximity to cortical lesions might underlie MRI abnormalities.

The NAWM precedes the lesions. It has been shown that the apparent diffusion coefficient (ADC) precedes the development of new plaques. Later increases during BBB breakdown (gadolinium enhancement) and finally decays after the enhancement.

BBB disruption takes place on NAWM areas. This can be read in different ways. Maybe some hidden changes in White Matter structure trigger the BBB disruption, or maybe the same process that creates the NAWM areas disrupts the BBB after some time.

Pre-active lesions are lesions in an early stage of development. They resolve sometimes without further damage, and not always develop into demyelinating lesions. They present clusters of activated microglia in otherwise normal-appearing white matter.

Oligodendrocyte abnormalities appear to be crucially involved. The earliest change reported in the lesions examined is widespread oligodendrocyte apoptosis in which T cells, macrophages, activated microglia, reactive astrocytes, and neurons appear normal. This observation points to some change in the local environment (NAWM) to which oligodendrocytes are especially susceptible and which triggers a form of apoptosis.

Water diffusivity is higher in all NAWM regions, deep gray matter regions, and some cortical gray matter region of MS patients than normal controls.

Citrullination appears in SPMS. It seems that a defect of sphingolipid metabolism modifies the properties of normal appearing white matter. Related to these, peptidylarginine deiminase 2 is increased in patients with MS, and is related to arginine de-imination.

NAWM shows a decreased perfusion which does not appear to be secondary to axonal loss. The reduced perfusion of the NAWM in MS might be caused by a widespread astrocyte dysfunction, possibly related to a deficiency in astrocytic beta(2)-adrenergic receptors and a reduced formation of cAMP, resulting in a reduced uptake of K(+) at the nodes of Ranvier and a reduced release of K(+) in the perivascular spaces. This would be consistent again with cases of Chronic cerebrospinal venous insufficiency.

White matter lesions appear in NAWM areas, and their behavior can be predicted by MRI parameters as MTR (magnetization transfer ratio). This MTR parameter is related to axonal density.

It also seems that myelin basic protein (MBP) from multiple sclerosis (MS) patients contains lower levels of phosphorylation at Thr97 than normal individuals.

NAWM is the place where lesions appear and the process seems to be made by microglia, in absence of leukocyte infiltration, astrogliosis or demyelination. At the final stage of the process, these microglia develop into active demyelinating MS lesion

In PPMS there is evidence that NAWM is affected by the same pathological processes that characterize WM lesions, namely inflammation, demyelination, axonal injury, macrophage infiltration and gliosis. Some evidence suggests that WM changes predict subsequent GM abnormalities, rather than the opposite. Anomalies in NAWM rather than lesions have a greater impact on later GM damage.

=== Gray matter damage. Normal Appearing Gray Matter ===
Gray matter tissue damage dominates the pathological process as MS progresses, and underlies neurological disability. Imaging correlates of gray matter atrophy indicate that mechanisms differ in RRMS and SPMS. Epstein-Barr virus could be involved, but is not likely. Involvement of the deep gray matter (DGM), suggested by magnetic resonance imaging, is confirmed, and most DGM lesions involve both GM and white matter. Inflammation in DGM lesions is intermediate between the destructive inflammation of white matter lesions and the minimal inflammation of cortical lesions.

Iron depositions appear in deep gray matter by magnetic field correlation MRI Differently from NAWM, NAGM areas are not related to the development of lesions

=== Diffusely abnormal white matter ===
Other active area of study is the Diffusely abnormal white matter (DAWM). It seems to be a reduction of myelin phospholipids that correlates with a reduction of the myelin water fraction. The DAWM consisted of extensive axonal loss, decreased myelin density, and chronic fibrillary gliosis, all of which were substantially abnormal compared with normal-appearing WM and significantly different from focal WM lesion pathology. Changes in the vasculature take place not only in focal lesions but also in DAWM as detected by postmortem MRI

=== Dirty appearing white matter ===
Dirty-appearing white matter (referred to as DAWM like the former case) is defined as a region with ill-defined borders of intermediate signal intensity between that of normal-appearing white matter (NAWM) and that of plaque on T2-weighted and proton density imaging. It is probably created by loss of myelin phospholipids, detected by the short T2 component, and axonal reduction.

=== Microglial nodules ===
Originally proposed as a biomarker, the presence of these nodules has a possible pathogenetic significance. Though their role in the lesion evolution is still unclear, their presence in normal-appearing white matter have been suggested to be an early stage of lesion formation

== Heterogeneity of the disease ==
Multiple sclerosis has been reported to be heterogeneous in its behavior, in its underlying mechanisms, in its response to medication and remarkably, also respect the response to the specific potassium channel autoantibody Kir4.1.

For some authors, what we call MS in reality is a heterogeneous group of diseases Some independent reports take also PPMS apart Some others point a connection between some MS cases and peripheral neuropathies

Some reports propose the existence of molecular biomarkers that determine the clinical course of the disease, but the relationship to the pathological types has still not been established as of 2016.

=== Demyelination patterns ===
Four different damage patterns have been identified in patients' brain tissues. The original report suggests that there may be several types of MS with different immune causes, and that MS may be a family of several diseases. Though originally was required a biopsy to classify the lesions of a patient, since 2012 it is possible to classify them by a blood test looking for antibodies against seven lipids, three of which are cholesterol derivatives.

It is believed that they may correlate with differences in disease type and prognosis, and perhaps with different responses to treatment. In any case, understanding lesion patterns can provide information about differences in disease between individuals and enable doctors to make more accurate treatment decisions

Patterns I and II show the classical pathological features of MS lesions with microglia and macrophages, while patterns III and IV are considered atypical and could be separated from the MS spectrum at some point.

The four identified patterns are:

Pattern I
The scar presents T-cells and macrophages around blood vessels, with preservation of oligodendrocytes, but no signs of complement system activation.

Pattern II
The scar presents T-cells and macrophages around blood vessels, with preservation of oligodendrocytes, as before, but also signs of complement system activation can be found. This pattern has been considered similar to damage seen in NMO, though AQP4 damage does not appear in pattern II MS lesions Nevertheless, pattern II has been reported to respond to plasmapheresis, which points to something pathogenic into the blood serum.

The complement system infiltration in these cases convert this pattern into a candidate for research into autoimmune connections like anti-Kir4.1, anti-Anoctamin-2 or anti-MOG mediated MS About the last possibility, research has found antiMOG antibodies in some pattern-II MS patients.

Sometimes autoimmunity against the human CNS has been triggered by accident or medical mistake. The reactions have been diverse according to the sources of the disease but pathological confirmed MS (damage fulfills all pathological criteria of MS) is among them, and it shows pattern II

Pattern II pathogenic T cells clonally expanded were found in the CN, specifically, CD4+ Th2 cells (secreting IL-4, L-5, and IL-13) have recently been described in pattern II MS, and their clones have been isolated as living cells The functional characterization shows that T cells releasing Th2 cytokines and helping B cells dominate the T-cell infiltrate in pattern II brain lesions.

Pattern III
The scars are diffuse with inflammation, distal oligodendrogliopathy and microglial activation. There is also loss of myelin-associated glycoprotein (MAG). The scars do not surround the blood vessels, and in fact, a rim of preserved myelin appears around the vessels. There is evidence of partial remyelinization and oligodendrocyte apoptosis. For some researchers this pattern is an early stage of the evolution of the others. For others, it represents ischaemia-like injury with a remarkable availability of a specific biomarker in CSF

Some authors have stated that distal oligodendrogliopathy could come from a metabolic process.

Pattern IV
The scar presents sharp borders and oligodendrocyte degeneration, with a rim of normal appearing white matter. There is a lack of oligodendrocytes in the center of the scar. There is no complement activation or MAG loss.

These differences are noticeable only in early lesions and the heterogeneity was controversial during some time because some research groups thought that these four patterns could be consequence of the age of the lesions. Nevertheless, after some debate among research groups, the four patterns model is accepted and the exceptional case found by Prineas has been classified as NMO

For some investigation teams this means that MS is a heterogeneous disease. The latter hypothesis is further corroborated by a recent study that demonstrated significant differences in routine cerebrospinal fluid findings between patients with pattern I lesions and patients with non-pattern I lesions, including a lack of CSF-restricted oligoclonal bands, in most pattern II and III patients. Finally, some patients previously diagnosed with pattern II MS were later found to have in fact MOG-IgG-related encephalomyelitis, suggesting that both the current clinicoradiological diagnostic criteria for MS and the histopathological criteria for MS may be insufficiently specific. Currently antibodies to lipids and peptides in sera, detected by microarrays, can be used as markers of the pathological subtype given by brain biopsy.

Other developments in this area is the finding that some lesions present mitochondrial defects that could distinguish types of lesions.

=== MRI Phenotypes ===
Several studies trying to establish a relationship between the pathological findings and MRI findings have been performed.

For example, pulsed magnetization transfer imaging, diffusion Tensor MRI, and VCAM-1 enhanced MRI have been reported to show the pathological differences of these patterns. Together with MRI, magnetic resonance spectroscopy allows to see the biochemical composition of the lesions, which shows at least two different patterns

Currently as of 2014, the MRI studies have led to the proposal of four MRI phenotypes, though both the classification and the relationship with the pathology remains controversial.

=== Other proposed correlations ===
Several correlations have been studied trying to establish a pathological classification:

- With clinical courses: No definitive relationship between these patterns and the clinical subtypes has been established by now, but some relations have been established. All the cases with PPMS (primary progressive) had pattern IV (oligodendrocyte degeneration) in the original study and nobody with RRMS was found with this pattern. Balo concentric sclerosis lesions have been classified as pattern III (distal oligodendrogliopathy). Neuromyelitis optica was associated with pattern II (complement mediated demyelination), though they show a perivascular distribution, at difference from MS pattern II lesions.
- With Optic Coherence Tomography: OCT of the retinal layer yields different results for PPMS and RRMS
- With CSF findings: Teams in Oxford and Germany, found correlation with CSF and progression in November 2001, and hypotheses have been made suggesting correlation between CSF findings and pathophysiological patterns. In particular, B-cell to monocyte ratio looks promising. The anti-MOG antibody has been investigated and finally led to the description of a new disease, AntiMOG associated encephalomyelitis. High levels of anti-nuclear antibodies are found normally in patients with MS. Recently, it has been shown that the CSF from PPMS patients can transport the disease. Some cases could belong to the anti-neurofascin demyelinating diseases category.
- Cortical lesions: Not all MS patients develop cortical lesions. Only around 40% of patients do. When they appear, they correlate to meningeal inflammation.
- With responses to therapy: It is known that 30% of MS patients are non-responsive to Beta interferon. The heterogeneous response to therapy can support the idea of heterogeneous aetiology. It has also been shown that IFN receptors and interleukins in blood serum predicts response to IFN therapy, specially IL-17, and interleukins IL12/IL10 ratio has been proposed as marker of clinical course. Besides:
  - Pattern II lesions patients are responsive to plasmapheresis, while others are not.
  - The subtype associated with macrophage activation, T cell infiltration and expression of inflammatory mediator molecules may be most likely responsive to immunomodulation with interferon-beta or glatiramer acetate.
  - People non-responsive to interferons are the most responsive to Copaxone
  - In general, people non-responsive to a treatment is more responsive to other, and changing therapy can be effective.
  - There are genetic differences between responders and not responders. Though the article points to heterogeneous metabolic reactions to interferons instead of disease heterogeneity, it has been shown that most genetic differences are not related to interferon behavior
- With response to NMO-IgG:: NMO-IgG is the immunoglobulin that attacks Aquaporin-4 in Devic's disease. Multiple sclerosis patients do not have it in blood, but it has been shown that 13% of tested patients reacted with the epitope AQPaa252-275. It is not known if these antibodies define distinct MS subsets, or are simply markers of astrocytic damage
- With lesion structure: Cavitary lesions appear only in a subset of patients with a worse clinical course than normal
- Response to intravenous immunoglobin: The response to IVIG is strongly dependent from the genetic profile of each person in a predictive way
- Comorbidity with diabetes: Diabetes mellitus type 1 (T1D) is produced by special leukocyte antigen haplotypes, which seem to be involved also in some cases of MS

== Progressive MS ==
=== Primary progressive MS ===
It is currently discussed whether Primary Progressive MS (PPMS) is a different pathological entity or a different degree of the same pathology. No agreement has been established but there are some pathological features that are specific to PPMS. For example, meningeal inflammation is different respect standard cases of Recurrent-Recidivant MS (RRMS) and sodium accumulation is higher. Diffusely Abnormal White Matter (DAWM) is different than in RRMS/SPMS patients and it has been shown that CSF from PPMS patients can transport the disease

From a pathological point of view, PPMS characteristics are slow expansion of pre-existing white matter lesions, massive cortical demyelination, and extensive diffuse injury of the normal appearing white matter. As in relapsing MS also in progressive MS active tissue injury is invariably associated with inflammation, but inflammation seems to be trapped behind a closed blood brain barrier

A specially remarkable difference between PPMS and SPMS are some follicle-like B-cells structures in the meninges of SPMS patients, that have never been reported in PPMS patients. These follicles appear to be related to cortical demyelination in SPMS.

No disease modifying drug is approved for PPMS. Currently Natalizumab is being studied

=== Secondary progressive MS ===
Secondary progressive MS shows follicle-like B-cells structures (a.k.a. Ectopic Follicle-Like Structures, EFS's, or Tertiary Lynphoid Tissues, TLT's) in the meninges that appear associated with underlying subpial cortical damage. These follicles do not appear in Primary Progressive (PPMS) nor in Remitant-Relapsing MS (RRMS).

== Pathology of early MS and silent MS ==
McDonald criteria rely in detecting the lesions disseminated in time and space that define MS by clinical observations. Therefore, normally they do not allow to establish a diagnosis for definite MS before two clinical attacks have appeared. This means that for clinical definite cases, MS condition has been present for a long time, complicating the study of the initial stages. To study the initial stages of MS, some additional paraclinical tests must be used to prove the presence and dissemination of the lesions.

Sometimes patients with their first isolated attack (Clinically Isolated syndrome, or CIS) but before the confirming second attack (Preclinical MS) can be accepted to study the initial MS pathology but there is a study suggesting that any MS case begins as a silent pathology that can remain unnoticed even for five years. Therefore, even the CIS can appear too late in MS evolution.

Cases of MS before the CIS are sometimes found during other neurological inspections and are referred to as subclinical MS., or sometimes Clinically silent MS. The previous reference states that clinically silent MS plaques were located in the periventricular areas. This reference also reports an estimate of the prevalence of silent MS as high as about 25%. Oligodendrocytes evolution is similar to normal MS clinical courses

Sometimes patients that undergo an MRI examination for an unrelated cause can show lesions in their brains. These cases of isolated MRI findings have been recently baptised as RIS (Radiologically Isolated Syndrome) and are the most common inspections in which suggestions of silent MS have appeared.

In respect to the pathology of the RIS cases, we can point out that they show cortical lesions, mainly in patients with oligoclonal bands. Macroscopic damage is similar to RRMS cases but milder. Cervical cord lesions are an important predictor of progression and the quotient N-acetylaspartate to creatine suggest axonal damage

== See also ==
- Pathophysiology of multiple sclerosis
