= Chronic relapsing inflammatory optic neuropathy =

Episodic inflammation of the optic nerve

- Other names: Chronic relapsing inflammatory optic neuritis
- Specialty: Ophthalmology, Neurology, Neuro-ophthalmology
- Diagnostic method: Consensus Diagnostic Criteria
- Differential diagnosis: Optic neuritis subgroups
- Treatment: Corticosteroids

Chronic relapsing inflammatory optic neuropathy (CRION) is a form of recurrent optic neuritis that is steroid responsive and dependent. Patients typically present with pain associated with visual loss. CRION is a clinical diagnosis of exclusion, and other demyelinating, autoimmune, and systemic causes should be ruled out. An accurate antibody test which became available commercially in 2017 has allowed most patients previously diagnosed with CRION to be re-identified as having MOG antibody disease, which is not a diagnosis of exclusion. Early recognition is crucial given risks for severe visual loss and because it is treatable with immunosuppressive treatment such as steroids or B-cell depleting therapy. Relapse that occurs after reducing or stopping steroids is a characteristic feature.

== Signs and symptoms ==
Pain, visual loss, relapse, and steroid response are typical of CRION. Ocular pain is typical, although there are some cases with no reported pain. Bilateral severe visual loss (simultaneous or sequential) usually occurs, but there are reports of unilateral visual loss. Patients can have an associated relative afferent pupillary defect. CRION is associated with at least one relapse, and up to 18 relapses have been reported in an individual. Intervals between episodes can range from days to over a decade. Symptoms will improve with corticosteroids, and recurrence characteristically occurs after reducing or stopping steroids.

== Pathogenesis ==
In 2013, the etiology was unknown. Given that CRION is responsive to immunosuppressive treatment, it was presumed to be immune-mediated, but this was uncertain as at the time there were no known associated autoimmune antibodies.

In 2015, some research pointed to CRION belonging to the MOG antibody-associated encephalomyelitis spectrum.

As of 2019, the correlation between CRION and MOG antibody-associated encephalomyelitis is so high that now CRION is considered the most common phenotype related to myelin oligodendrocyte glycoprotein antibodies (MOG-IgG).

As of 2021, some reports point out a second kind of CRION due to anti-phospholipid antibodies.

== Diagnosis ==
In 2018, of 12 patients in a study who fulfilled the then-current diagnostic criteria for CRION, eleven (92%) were positive for MOG-IgG, and the last patient was borderline. Diagnosis requires exclusion of other neurological, ophthalmological, and systemic conditions. Any cause of optic neuropathy should be ruled out, including demyelinating (MOG antibody disease, multiple sclerosis, and neuromyelitis optica) and systemic disease (diabetic, toxic, nutritional, and infectious causes). Corticosteroid responsive optic neuritis not associated with demyelinating disease should also be ruled out, including sarcoidosis, systemic lupus erythematosus, or other systemic autoimmune disease. Hereditary causes such as Leber's hereditary optic neuropathy are also part of the differential diagnosis.

In 2014, there were no diagnostic biomarkers or imaging features typical of CRION. Antinuclear antibodies (ANA), B_{12}, folate, thyroid function tests, anti-aquaporin-4 antibodies (NMO-IgG), and glial fibrillary acidic protein (GFAP) can facilitate ruling out of other diseases. Most patients are seronegative for NMO-IgG and GFAP, biomarkers for neuromyelitis optica. ANA, indicative of autoimmune optic neuropathy, is also generally negative. CSF can also be evaluated for oligoclonal bands typical of multiple sclerosis, which will not be present in CRION. A chest X-ray or CT scan should be ordered if granulomatous optic neuropathy caused by sarcoidosis is suspected.

Magnetic resonance imaging can capture optic nerve inflammation, but this finding is not present in all patients, Diffusion tensor imaging has been shown to detect widespread white matter abnormalities in CRION patients with normal MRI findings.

Five diagnostic criteria had been proposed in 2014:

- History of optic neuritis with one relapse
- Objectively measured visual loss
- NMO-IgG seronegative
- Contrast enhancement on imaging of acutely inflamed optic nerves
- Response to immunosuppressive treatment and relapse on withdrawal or dose reduction.

CRION has been included as a subtype in a 2022 international consensus classification of optic neuritis.

== Treatment ==
Treatment consists of three phases of immunotherapy:

- 1. Acute phase: IV steroids (methylprednisolone 1 mg/kg) for 3–5 days or plasmapheresis are given to restore visual function.
- 2. Intermediate phase: Oral steroids (typically prednisone 1 mg/kg) with taper are given to stabilize vision.
- 3. Long-term phase: To avoid adverse effects of long-term steroids and to avoid relapse of disease, physicians can transition to a steroid-sparing agent. B-cell depleting therapy, azathioprine, methotrexate, cyclophosphamide, mycophenolate, IVIG, plasma exchange, cyclosporine, and infliximab have been used.

Visual acuity is dramatically worse with CRION than other forms of optic neuritis. Treatment with corticosteroids induces prompt relief of pain and improved vision. At times, patients obtain complete restoration of vision, although exact success rates are unknown.

== Prognosis ==
Recurrence is essentially inevitable in patients without treatment, and patients ultimately will require lifelong immunosuppression to prevent relapse.

== Epidemiology ==
CRION was first described in 2003. The disease is rare, with only 122 cases published from 2003 to 2013. There is female predominance with 59 females (48%), 25 males (20%), and no gender designation for the rest of the 122 reported cases (32%). Age ranges from 14 to 69 years of age, and the mean age is 35.6. The disease is noted to occur worldwide and across many ethnicities, with reported cases in all continents except Africa and Australia.

== See also ==
- Optic neuritis
- Optic neuropathy
