= MOG antibody disease =

Inflammatory demyelinating disease

Myelin oligodendrocyte glycoprotein antibody disease
- Other names: MOG antibody disease
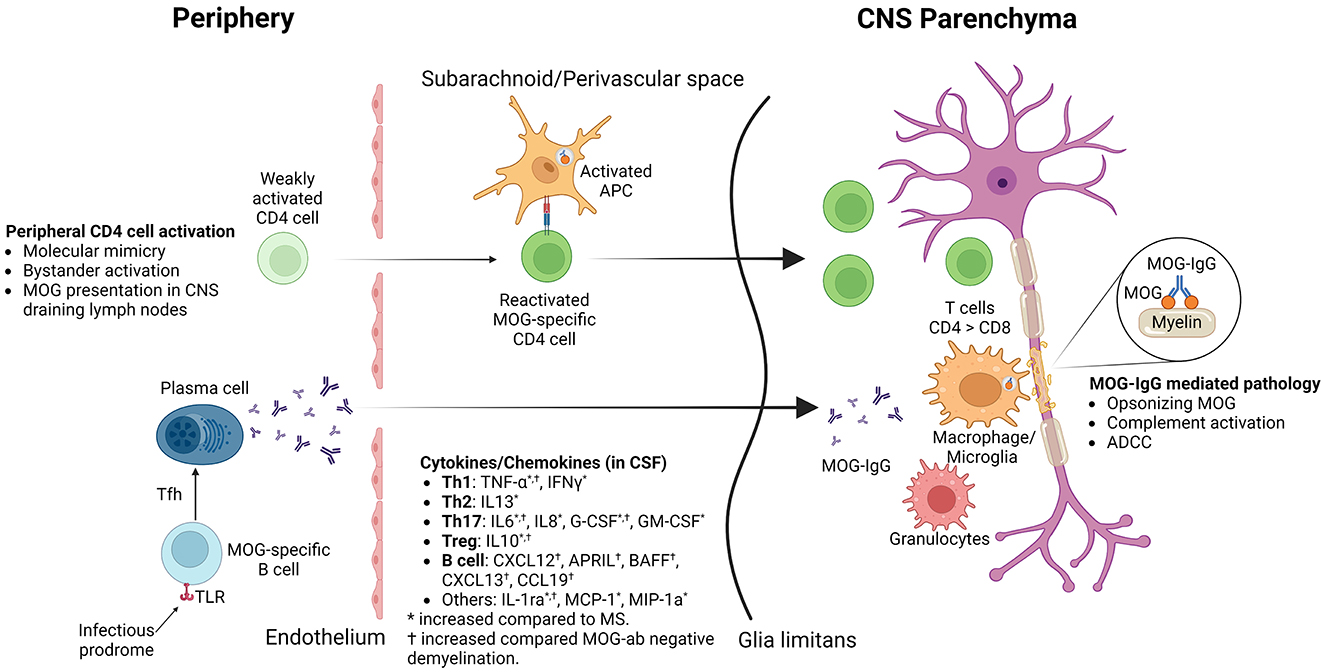
- An image depicting the pathophysiological immune reaction involved in the development of MOGAD.
- Specialty: Neurology, Immunology, Ophthalmology (in the context of impairment from optical inflammation)
- Symptoms: Usually in the form of some sort of myelitis or neuritis in adults, with the most commonly observed being transverse myelitis, optic neuritis and neuromyelitis optica. Multiple sclerosis is a frequent comorbidity. Can also present as a distinct type of acute disseminated encephalomyelitis characterized by MS-like lesions either spotted in radiological imaging or definitively characterized during an autopsy on top of ADEM symptoms and transverse myelitis, particularly in children.
- Causes: Unknown, post-infectious autoimmune responses from molecular mimicry from pathogens and cross-reactivity with retroviral proteins from antibodies proposed.
- Diagnostic method: Attempting to detect antibodies to the MOG protein from samples using methods such as a cell-based assay or CSF tap and probing for evidence of demyelination. Exclusion of other plausible differentials is also required to prevent overdiagnosis and delayed treatment of other conditions.
- Treatment: Depends on symptoms, usually high doses of corticosteroids, intravenous immunoglobulin, plasma exchange. If the patient has continuously recurring symptoms, long term immunosuppresion therapies may be needed.
- Prognosis: 50-80% will experience permanent disability from demyelination.

MOG (myelin oligodendrocyte glycoprotein) antibody disease (MOGAD) or MOG antibody-associated encephalomyelitis (MOG-EM) is an inflammatory demyelinating disease of the central nervous system. Serum anti-myelin oligodendrocyte glycoprotein antibodies are present in up to half of patients with an acquired demyelinating syndrome and have been described in association with a range of phenotypic presentations, including acute disseminated encephalomyelitis, optic neuritis, transverse myelitis, and neuromyelitis optica.

== Presentation ==
The clinical presentation is variable and largely dependent upon the overall clinical manifestation.

The presence of anti-MOG autoantibodies has been described in association with the following conditions:

- Seronegative neuromyelitis optica.
- Acute disseminated encephalomyelitis, especially in recurrent and fulminant cases.
- Multiple sclerosis.
- Optic neuritis(including cases of CRION (chronic relapsing inflammatory optic neuropathy)
- Transverse myelitis
- Aseptic meningitis and meningoencephalitis (typically post-infectious).

The most common presenting phenotypes are acute disseminated encephalomyelitis (ADEM) in children and optic neuritis (ON) in adults. Some of these phenotypes have been studied in detail:

=== Seronegative neuromyelitis optica ===
Anti-MOG antibodies have been described in some patients with NMOSD who were negative for the aquaporin 4 (AQP-4) antibody. However, most NMOSD is an astrocytopathy, specifically an AQP4 antibody-associated disease, whereas MOG antibody-associated disease is an oligodendrocytopathy, suggesting that these are two separate pathologic entities. Rare cases have been described of patients with antibodies against both AQP4 and MOG. These patients typically have MS-like brain lesions, multifocal spine lesions and optic nerve atrophy. However, the coexistence of both antibodies is still a matter of ongoing debate.

=== ADEM ===
The presence of anti-MOG antibodies is more common in children with ADEM.

=== Tumefactive demyelination ===
Rare cases of anti-MOG antibodies in association with tumefactive multiple sclerosis have been described.

== Causes ==
The reason why anti-MOG auto-antibodies appear remains unknown.

A post-infectious autoimmune process has been proposed as a possible pathophysiologic mechanism. Other reports point to molecular mimicry between MOG and some viruses as a possible etiology.

== Histopathology ==
Demyelinating lesions of MOG-associated encephalomyelitis resemble more those observed in multiple sclerosis than NMO. They are similar to pattern-II multiple sclerosis with T-cells and macrophages surrounding blood vessels, preservation of oligodendrocytes and signs of complement system activation.

Several studies performed during 2020 have shown that MOGAD lesions differ from those seen in MS in many aspects, including their topographical distribution in the CNS, the type of demyelination, and the nature of the inflammatory response.

- MOGAD demyelination occurs by confluence of small perivenous lesions, generally resulting in a demyelination pattern similar to that seen in acute disseminated encephalomyelitis. Demyelination in MOGAD is associated with complement deposition at the site of active myelin injury, but the degree of complement activation is much less compared to that seen in patients with aquaporin 4 antibody associated neuromyelitis optica (NMO).
- While in MS the dominant inflammatory reaction is seen around the larger drainage veins in the periventricular tissue and the meninges, in MOGAD the smaller veins and venules are mainly affected.
- Finally, in MOGAD, infiltrating lymphocytes are mainly CD4+ T-cells with low numbers of CD8+ T-cells and B-cells; the dominant lymphocytes in active MS lesions are tissue resident CD8+ effector memory T-cells and B-cells / plasma cells.

== Diagnosis ==
MOG-IgG is detected by means of so-called cell-based assays (CBA). CBA using live cells transfected with full-length human MOG and employing Fc-specific detection antibodies are the gold standard for anti-MOG antibody testing. Serum is the specimen of choice; cerebrospinal fluid (CSF) analysis is less sensitive compared to serum testing.

Cerebrospinal fluid oligoclonal bands, the diagnostic mainstay in multiple sclerosis (MS), are rare in MOG-EM, both in adults and in children. If present at all, intrathecal IgG synthesis is low in most patients, often transient, and mainly restricted to acute attacks. CSF findings are significantly more pronounced in acute myelitis than in acute ON, which is frequently associated with normal CSF findings, and depends significantly on disease activity (more pronounced during acute attacks), attack severity, and spinal cord lesion extension. CSF white cell numbers in MOG-EM may be higher than in MS, especially in acute myelitis, but normal cell numbers do not rule out the disease. CSF often contains neutrophil granulocytes and CSF L-lactate levels may be elevated, thus mimicking bacterial meningitis in some cases. The intrathecal, polyclonal antiviral immune response (so-called MRZ reaction), which is present in around 63% of MS patients, is absent in MOG-EM.

Proposed diagnostic criteria require serum positivity for MOG antibody as detected by CBA, a clinicoradiological presentation consistent with an acquired demyelinating syndrome (VEP can replace radiological evidence only in patients with acute ON), and exclusion of alternative diagnoses; in addition, so-called 'red flags' have been defined, which, if present, should prompt physicians to challenge the diagnosis and to prompt re-testing for MOG-IgG, ideally using a second, methodologically different assay.

In the young, MRI typically shows ADEM–like lesions and longitudinally extensive transverse myelitis (LETM), whereas optic neuritis and short transverse myelitis are more commonly seen in older patients. However, rare cases of symptomatic MRI-negative MOG-related disease have been described.

== Clinical course ==
Two clinical courses have been described:

- Monophasic (about 50%)
- Relapsing

== Treatment ==
Acute therapy consists of high-dose corticosteroids, IVIG, or plasma exchange, and long-term immunosuppression may be necessary in recurrent cases. Anti-MOG positive patients should not be treated with interferons as these may worsen the disease course similar to those with NMOSD. MOG-ON is corticosteroid responsive.

There are also anecdotal reports against using fingolimod or alemtuzumab.

== Prognosis ==
Residual disability develops in 50–80% of patients, with transverse myelitis at onset being the most significant predictor of long-term outcome.. There is emerging evidence that visual outcome in MOG-ON is better in patients who are treated with corticosteroids than without treatment.

== Research ==
Animal models in experimental autoimmune encephalomyelitis, EAE, have shown that "MOG-specific EAE models (of different animal strains) display/mirror human multiple sclerosis" but EAE pathology is closer to NMO and ADEM than to the confluent demyelination observed in MS.

== History ==
Reports describing the possible involvement of anti-MOG antibodies in multiple sclerosis and other demyelinating conditions first appeared in the literature in the late 1980s, but evidence to support their role in demyelinating disease was always weak and inconsistent. The possibility of an anti-MOG MS-subtype was considered around 2000.

The turning point was in 2011, when Mader et al. developed a cell-based assay using HEK 293 cells which increased the detection rate of these antibodies in the serum.

Reports about prevalence of anti-MOG in selected Multiple Sclerosis cases began to appear in 2016

== See also ==
- FLAMES (medicine)
