= FLAMES (medicine) =

Disease affecting humans

FLAIR-hyperintense lesions in anti-MOG associated encephalitis with seizures (FLAMES) is a clinical sub entity of myelin oligodendrocyte glycoprotein antibody associated disease.

It is a rare condition, first observed in 2017, with only a few cases known in the literature.
