= Autoimmune optic neuropathy =

Visual loss due to optic nerve inflammation

Autoimmune optic neuropathy (AON), sometimes called autoimmune optic neuritis, may be a forme fruste of systemic lupus erythematosus (SLE) associated optic neuropathy. AON is more than the presence of any optic neuritis in a patient with an autoimmune process, as it describes a relatively specific clinical syndrome. AON is characterized by chronically progressive or recurrent vision loss associated with serological evidence of autoimmunity. Specifically, this term has been suggested for cases of optic neuritis with serological evidence of vasculitis by positive ANA, despite the lack of meeting criteria for SLE. The clinical manifestations include progressive vision loss that tends to be steroid-responsive and steroid dependent.

Patients with defined SLE that go on to develop optic neuritis should be better identified as lupus optic neuritis.

== Signs and symptoms ==
AON was first described in 1982. It presents with visual loss and signs of optic nerve dysfunction, such as loss of color vision, afferent pupil defect, and sometimes abnormalities of the optic disc. The clinical features of AON can be variable and present in several unilateral or bilateral forms:

- Acute anterior or retrobulbar optic neuritis sometimes associated with pain.
- Anterior or retrobulbar ischemic optic neuropathy not associated with pain.
- Chronic progressive vision loss that mimics a compressive lesion.

The main features that differentiate AON from the more common typical demyelinating optic neuritis is the poor recovery of vision and the chronic or recurrent or bilateral course of AON. Furthermore, the workup for multiple sclerosis including MRI, will be negative. Thus, it may be necessary to diagnose AON after a period of observation, noting the problem is not behaving as expected for demyelinative disease.

== Pathogenesis ==
Approximately 1-2% of patients with defined SLE develop an optic neuropathy during the course of their disease. SLE-associated optic neuritis is rarely the presenting sign of the disease. The molecular pathogenesis is hypothesized, based on clinical features and the emerging understanding of mechanisms in SLE. Inflammation resulting from auto-antibodies, immune complexes, T-cells and complement, probably damages the components of the optic nerve, as well as the blood vessels (vasculitis). The resulting vasculitis causes a loss of blood supply to the nerve (ischemia). This combination of inflammation and ischemia may produce reversible changes such as demyelination alone, or more permanent damage axonal (necrosis), or a combination. The poor recovery of vision in AON despite anti-inflammatory treatment suggests that ischemia from the underlying vasculitis is an important component, but the details have not been established. It may be reasonable to consider that AON pathogenesis represents an incomplete expression of the SLE-associated optic neuropathy disease process.

== Treatment ==
AON is a rare disease and the natural history of the disease process is not well defined. Unlike typical optic neuritis, there is no association with multiple sclerosis, but the visual prognosis for AON is worse than typical optic neuritis. Thus AON patients have different treatment, and often receive chronic immunosuppression. No formal recommendation can be made regarding the best therapeutic approach. However, the available evidence to date supports treatment with corticosteroids and other immunosuppressive agents.

Early diagnosis and prompt treatment with systemic corticosteroids may restore some visual function but the patient may remain steroid dependent; vision often worsens when corticosteroids are tapered. As such, long-term steroid-sparing immunosuppressive agents may be required to limit the side-effects of steroids and minimize the risk of worsening vision.
