= Anti-neurofascin demyelinating diseases =

Diseases causing demyelination

Anti-neurofascin demyelinating diseases (anti-NF diseases) refers to health conditions engendered by auto-antibodies against neurofascins, which can produce both central and peripheral demyelination. Some cases of combined central and peripheral demyelination (CCPD) could be produced by them.

- Chronic inflammatory demyelinating polyneuropathy: Some cases of CIDP are reported to be produced by auto-antibodies against several neurofascin proteins. These proteins are present in the neurons and four of them have been reported to produce disease: NF186, NF180, NF166 and NF155.
- Neuromyelitis optica: NF auto antibodies can also appear in NMO cases. These antibodies are more related to the peripheral nervous demyelination, but they were also found in NMO.
- Multiple sclerosis: Also antibodies against neurofascins NF-155 can also appear in atypical multiple sclerosis and NF-186 could be involved in subtypes of MS yielding an intersection between both conditions. Around 10% of MS cases are now thought to be anti-NF cases.

== Current status ==
Whether ANFAs are part of a unique and emerging disease entity, disease modifiers, or inconsequential remains to be elucidated with time. Anti-neurofascin antibodies are found in multiple sclerosis, and chronic inflammatory demyelinating polyradiculoneuropathy.

== History ==
The first report about a subgroup of MS patients with anti-NF and contactin 2 auto-antibodies was published in 2011.
