= Unicentric Castleman disease =

- Other names: Giant lymph node hyperplasia, lymphoid hamartoma, angiofollicular lymph node hyperplasia
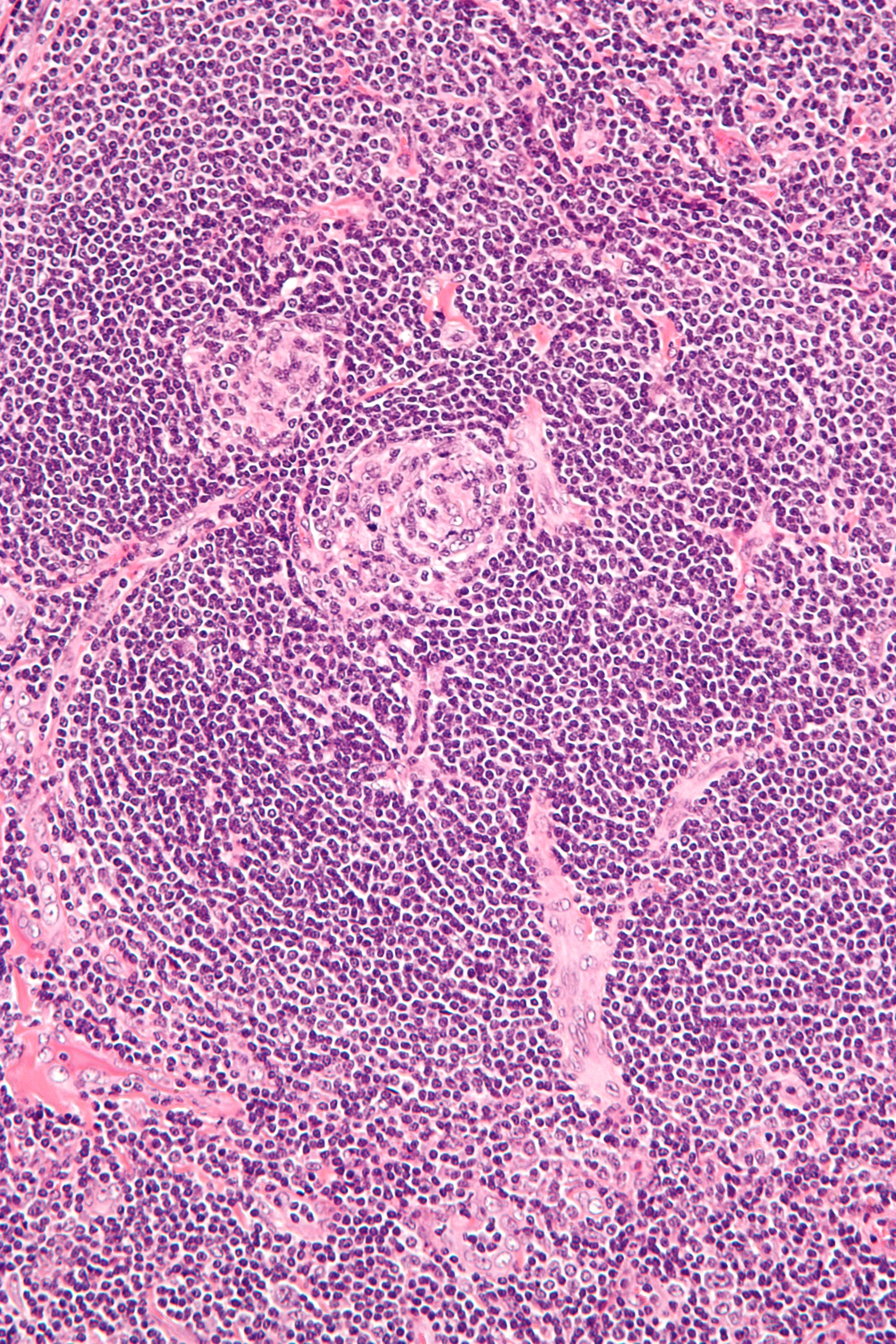
- Micrograph of lymph node biopsy demonstrating hyaline vascular features consistent with Castleman disease
- Specialty: Hematology, immunology, rheumatology, pathology
- Diagnostic method: Based on patient history, physical exam, laboratory testing, medical imaging, histopathology
- Frequency: Approximately 5000-6000 new cases per year in the United States

Unicentric Castleman disease is a subtype of Castleman disease (also known as giant lymph node hyperplasia, lymphoid hamartoma, or angiofollicular lymph node hyperplasia), a group of lymphoproliferative disorders characterized by lymph node enlargement, characteristic features on microscopic analysis of enlarged lymph node tissue, and a range of symptoms and clinical findings.

People with unicentric Castleman disease (UCD) have an enlarged lymph node or multiple enlarged lymph nodes in a single lymph node region. It is the most common subtype of Castleman disease, symptoms are typically mild, abnormalities on blood tests are uncommon, organ dysfunction is uncommon, and surgical treatment is curative in the majority of patients. The cause of UCD is not known.

Castleman disease is named after Benjamin Castleman, who first described the disease in 1956. The Castleman Disease Collaborative Network is the largest organization focused on the disease and is involved in research, awareness, and patient support.

== Signs and symptoms ==
In approximately half of patients, UCD presents without symptoms; however, people with the disease may experience enlarged lymph nodes in a single lymph node region or report symptoms related to compression of neighboring structures by enlarged lymph nodes, such as difficulty breathing and pain or pressure in the abdomen or chest.

Systemic symptoms (fever, night sweats, weight loss, fatigue) are seen in up to half of UCD patients.

Some symptoms that are commonly seen in HHV-8-associated MCD and iMCD like extravascular fluid accumulation (peripheral edema, ascites, pleural effusions), and enlargement of the liver and/or spleen are uncommon in UCD.

=== Associated diseases ===
UCD is associated with increased risk of paraneoplastic pemphigus as well as bronchiolitis obliterans (BO), AA amyloidosis, vascular neoplasms (e.g., FDC sarcoma), and possibly lymphomas.

== Causes ==
UCD has no known causes or risk factors. Cases of Castleman disease running in families have been reported; however, no causative genetic variants have been identified

== Mechanism ==
The mechanism of UCD is poorly understood. Most published research supports a growth of abnormal immune system cells (neoplasm) as the most likely cause of UCD, but this has not been conclusively demonstrated or fully characterized. Other proposed mechanisms include viral infections and autoimmune processes. Because surgical removal of affected lymph nodes in UCD is typically curative and recurrence is rare, it is believed that the pathologic process is limited to affected lymph nodes. Unlike HHV-8-associated MCD, which is caused by the HHV-8 virus, UCD has not been associated with HHV-8 infection^{1}

When findings typically seen in MCD, such as systemic symptoms and laboratory abnormalities, they are likely related to increased levels of molecules that stimulate the immune system (cytokines), such as interleukin 6 (IL-6). Systemic symptoms and laboratory abnormalities may be associated with the presence of plasmacytic features on microscopic analysis of affected lymph node tissue.

There have been no reported cases of UCD transforming into iMCD.

== Diagnosis ==
UCD is diagnosed based on patient history, physical exam, laboratory testing, radiologic imaging, and microscopic analysis (histology) of biopsied tissue from an enlarged lymph node.

There are no widely accepted diagnostic criteria for UCD; however, diagnosis generally requires enlargement of lymph nodes limited to a single region of lymph nodes (typically confirmed with radiologic imaging), biopsy of an enlarged lymph node demonstrating characteristic features of Castleman disease, and exclusion of other diseases that can mimic UCD.

=== Classification ===
Castleman disease describes a group of at least 3 distinct disorders—unicentric Castleman disease (UCD), human herpesvirus 8 associated multicentric Castleman disease (HHV-8-associated MCD), and idiopathic multicentric Castleman disease (iMCD). Identifying the correct subtype of the disease is important, as the three disorders vary significantly in symptoms, clinical findings, disease mechanism, treatment approach, and prognosis.

- In Unicentric Castleman disease enlarged lymph nodes with characteristic microscopic findings are present in only a single lymph node region.
- In the multicentric subtypes of Castleman disease, enlarged lymph nodes with characteristic findings are present in multiple lymph node regions. The multicentric variants of Castleman disease are further classified by known causes of the disease.
  - HHV-8-associated MCD is caused by uncontrolled infection with human herpesvirus 8 (HHV-8, also known as Kaposi sarcoma-associated herpesvirus).
  - In idiopathic multicentric Castleman disease (iMCD) the cause of the disease is unknown (idiopathic). Testing for HHV-8 must be negative to diagnose iMCD.

=== Medical imaging ===
Radiologic imaging shows an enlarged lymph node or multiple enlarged lymph nodes in a single region, which are typically 18F-fluorodoxyglucose (FDG) avid on positron-emission tomography (PET).

=== Laboratory testing ===
Laboratory testing is typically normal, including blood counts, metabolic tests, and inflammatory markers; however, in some people with UCD, laboratory testing may show abnormalities more commonly seen in HHV-8-associated MCD or iMCD. These abnormal tests include elevated C-Reactive Protein, decreased hemoglobin levels (anemia), low albumin levels, elevated creatinine (kidney dysfunction), increased immunoglobulin levels, abnormal platelet counts, and elevations of molecules involved in inflammation (cytokines), such as interleukin 6 (IL-6).

=== Pathology ===
The microscopic appearance (histology) of biopsied tissue from an enlarged lymph node must demonstrate a constellation of features consistent with Castleman disease. There are three patterns of characteristic histologic features associated with UCD:

- Hyaline vascular - regressed germinal centers, follicular dendritic cell prominence or displasia, hypervascularity in interfollicular regions, sclerotic vessels, prominent mantle zones with an “onion-skin” appearance.
- Plasmacytic – increased number of follicles with large hyperplastic germinal centers and sheetlike plasmacytosis (increased number plasma cells).
- Mixed - features of both hyaline vascular and plasmacytic patterns

UCD most commonly demonstrates hyaline vascular features; however, plasmacytic features or a mixture of both hyaline vascular and plasmacytic features may also be seen in UCD lymph nodes. The clinical utility of subtyping Castleman disease by histologic features is uncertain, as histologic subtypes do not consistently predict disease severity or treatment response.

Staining with latency-associated nuclear antigen (LANA-1), a marker for HHV-8 infection, must be negative to diagnose UCD.

=== Diseases to be excluded ===
Diagnosis of UCD requires ruling out other diseases that can present with enlarged lymph nodes limited to a single region of lymph nodes and histologic findings similar to UCD on microscopic analysis of biopsied lymph nodes. This include infectious causes, such as toxoplasma lymphadenitis, and cancers, including Hodgkin lymphoma, follicular dendritic cell sarcoma, and plasmacytoma.

== Treatment ==
Due to the rarity of the disease, data regarding treatment is limited to observational case series and case reports. No randomized trials have been conducted comparing treatment options for UCD.

Complete surgical removal of the enlarged lymph node or region of lymph nodes is considered the gold standard treatment for UCD and is typically curative, with resolution of symptoms and lab abnormalities attributable to the disease.

Occasionally, surgical removal of an enlarged lymph node may be prohibitively high risk at the time of diagnosis due to large size or proximity to critical structures. This is more common with lymph nodes located deep in the chest, which may be close to major airways and blood vessels. In these cases, chemotherapy, immunosuppressive medications, catheter embolization of blood vessels supplying the lymph node, and/or radiation therapy may be used to shrink the involved lymph nodes, potentially reducing the risk of surgery to acceptable levels. If surgical risk remains too high after treatment to shrink the enlarged lymph node, treatments used to reduce the size of the lymph node may be continued to control symptoms related to the disease.

=== Follow-up ===
After initiation of treatment, patients are regularly evaluated for recurrence of disease and response to treatment with laboratory testing and radiologic imaging.

== Prognosis ==
Most people with UCD who undergo complete surgical resection of enlarged lymph nodes achieve long-term disease-free survival, with an observed ten-year mortality of 4% in the largest case series to date.

== Epidemiology ==
There are approximately 5000-6000 new cases of UCD diagnosed per year in the United States, making it the most common form of Castleman disease. UCD can occur at any age, but the median age at presentation is approximately 35 years old. There is a slightly increased incidence of UCD in women.

There have been no published epidemiologic studies of Castleman disease outside of the United States; however, there is no evidence of increased or decreased incidence of Castleman disease in specific regions or ethnicities.

== History ==
Castleman disease was first described by Dr. Benjamin Castleman in 1956. World Castleman Disease Day was established in 2018 and is held every year on July 23.

=== Organizations ===
The Castleman Disease Collaborative Network was founded in 2012 and is the largest organization focused on Castleman disease. It is a global collaborative network involved in research, awareness, and patient support.
