= HHV-8-associated MCD =

Disease subtype

- Other names: Giant lymph node hyperplasia, lymphoid hamartoma, angiofollicular lymph node hyperplasia
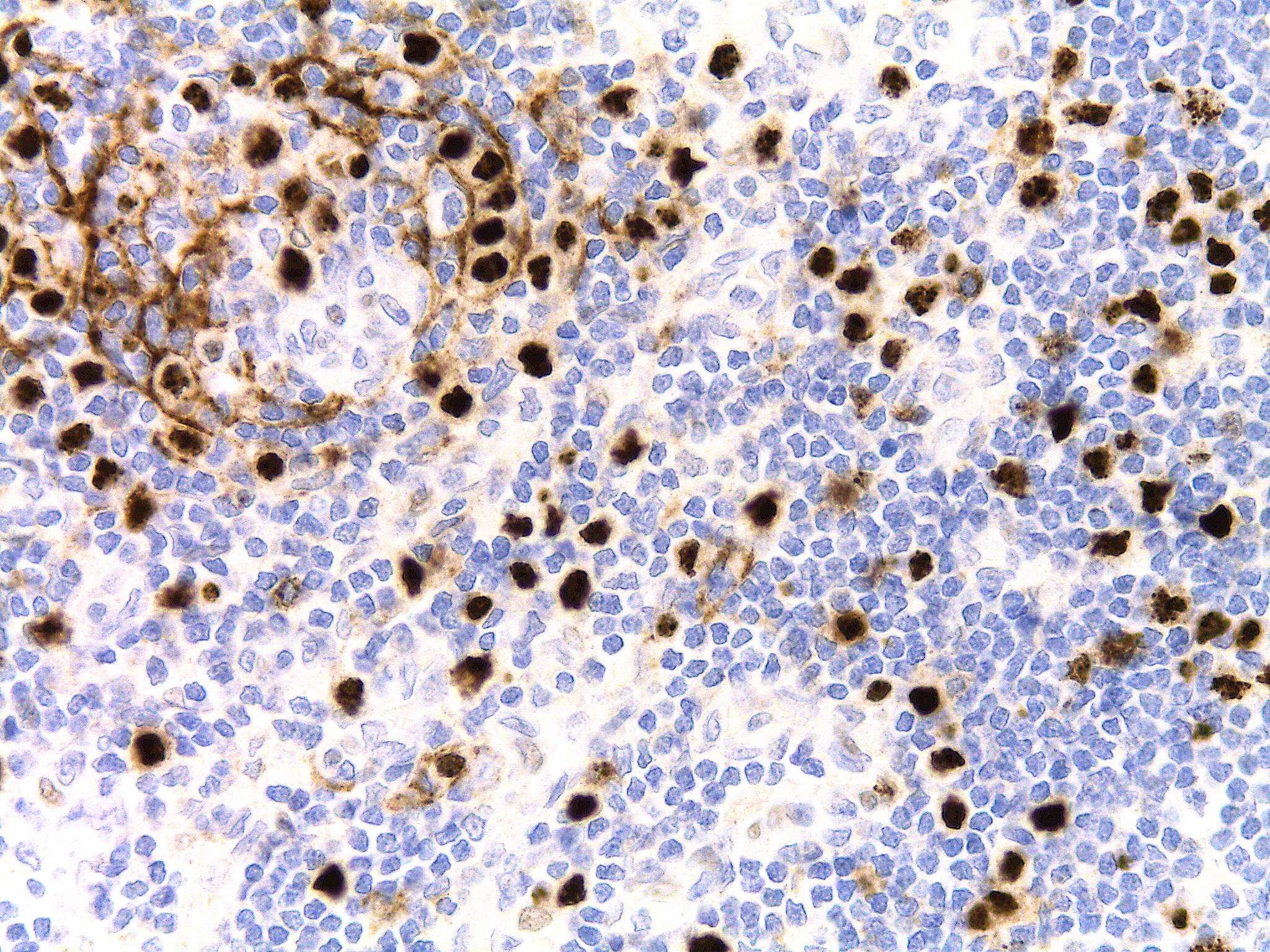
- Micrograph of HHV8-associated Castleman's Disease showing LANA-1 positive lymphoblasts in a regressed germinal center and mantle zone. LANA-1 stain.
- Specialty: Hematology, immunology, infectious disease, pathology
- Diagnostic method: Based on patient history, physical exam, laboratory testing, medical imaging, histopathology
- Frequency: Approximately 300 new cases per year in the United States

Human herpesvirus 8 associated multicentric Castleman disease (HHV-8-associated MCD) is a subtype of Castleman disease (also known as giant lymph node hyperplasia, lymphoid hamartoma, or angiofollicular lymph node hyperplasia), a group of rare lymphoproliferative disorders characterized by lymph node enlargement, characteristic features on microscopic analysis of enlarged lymph node tissue, and a range of symptoms and clinical findings.

People with human herpesvirus 8 associated multicentric Castleman disease (HHV-8-associated MCD) have enlarged lymph nodes in multiple regions and often have flu-like symptoms, abnormal findings on blood tests, and dysfunction of vital organs, such as the liver, kidneys, and bone marrow.

HHV-8-associated MCD is known to be caused by uncontrolled infection with the human herpesvirus 8 virus (HHV-8) and is most frequently diagnosed in patients with human immunodeficiency virus (HIV). HHV-8-associated MCD is treated with a variety of medications, including immunosuppressants, chemotherapy, and antivirals.

Castleman disease is named after Dr. Benjamin Castleman, who first described the disease in 1956. The Castleman Disease Collaborative Network is the largest organization focused on the disease and is involved in research, awareness, and patient support.

== Signs and symptoms ==
People with HHV-8-associated MCD may experience enlarged lymph nodes in multiple lymph node regions; systemic symptoms, such as fever, night sweats, unintended weight loss, and fatigue; rashes such as cherry hemangiomas or Kaposi sarcoma; enlargement of the liver and/or spleen; and extravascular fluid accumulation in the extremities (edema), abdomen (ascites), or lining of the lungs (pleural effusion).

=== Associated diseases ===
HHV-8-associated MCD is most commonly diagnosed in patients with human immunodeficiency virus (HIV), but can be seen in patients without HIV as well.

Patients with HHV-8-associated MCD are often found to have Kaposi sarcoma, a cancer caused by the HHV-8 virus and most commonly seen in patients with HIV. Patients with HHV-8-associated MCD have been observed to be at greater risk of developing lymphoma.

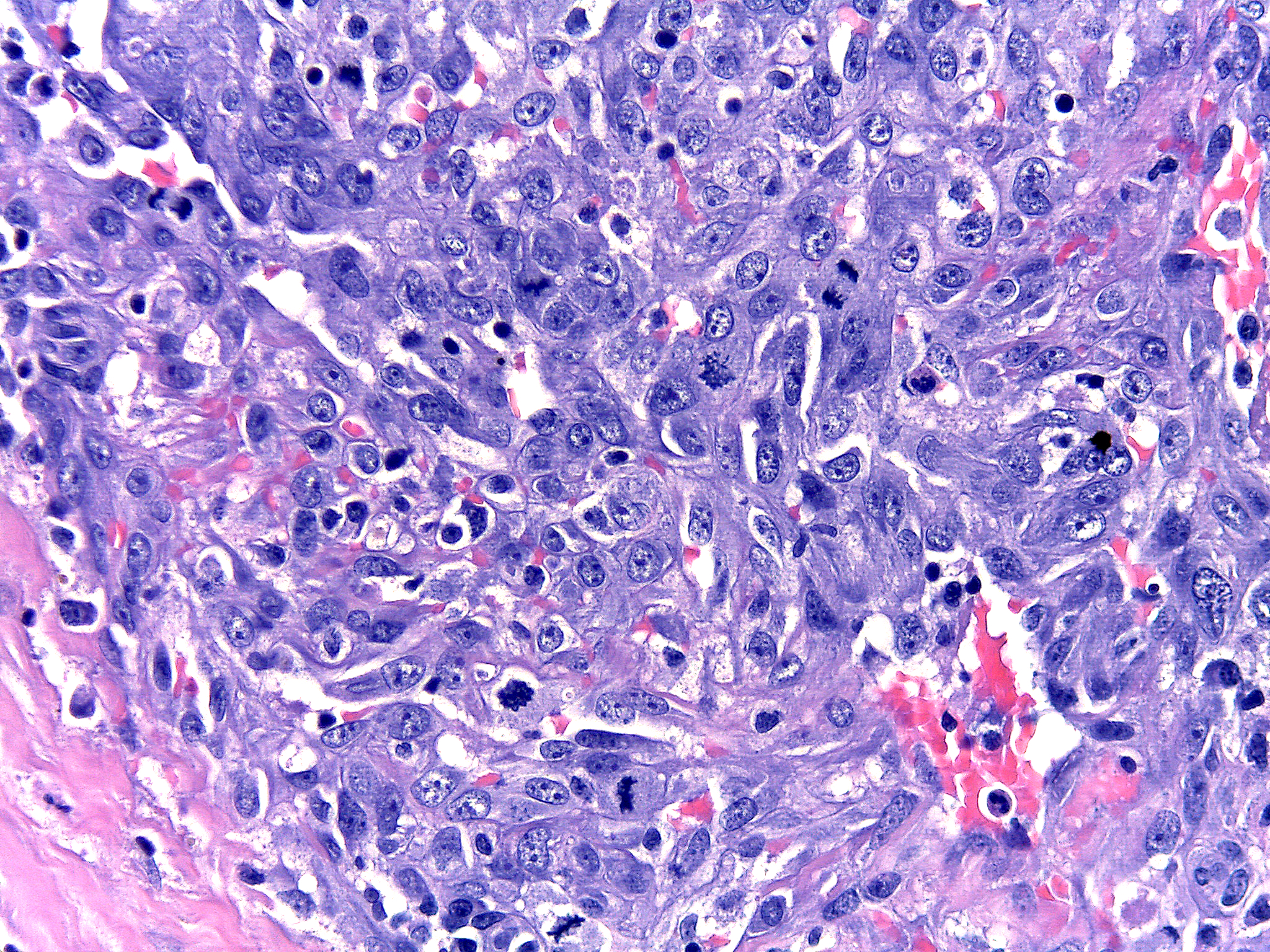
Micrograph of a Kaposi sarcoma in a lymph node biopsy of a patient with HHV8-associated MCD.

== Causes ==
HHV-8-associated MCD is known to be caused by infection with human herpesvirus-8. The HHV-8 virus is commonly found in healthy individuals showing no signs of disease, but it is also known to cause diseases such as Kaposi sarcoma and HHV-8-associated MCD. Diseases caused by HHV-8 are seen most frequently in the setting of immune dysfunction related to factors such as HIV infection or use of immunosuppressant medications; however, HHV-8-associated diseases, including HHV-8-associated MCD, have been reported in otherwise healthy individuals.

== Mechanism ==
In HHV-8-associated MCD the HHV-8 virus infects B cells and plasmablasts in lymph nodes and causes infected cells to release proinflammatory cytokines, signaling molecules that increase the activity of immune cells. In particular, HHV-8 infection of immune cells leads to increased levels of Interleukin-6 (IL-6), a cytokine known to play a role in other forms of Castleman disease.

The HHV-8 virus contains a gene coding for a viral variant of the IL-6 molecule. Cells infected by HHV-8 produce the viral variant of IL-6 and normal human IL-6, both of which contribute to the increased B cell proliferation and clinical findings seen in HHV-8-associated MCD.

== Diagnosis ==
HHV-8-associated MCD is diagnosed based on patient history, physical exam, laboratory testing, radiologic imaging, and microscopic analysis (histology) of biopsied tissue from an enlarged lymph node.

Formal criteria for the diagnosis of HHV-8-associated MCD have not been published; however, diagnosis requires enlargement of lymph nodes in multiple lymph node regions (typically confirmed with radiologic imaging), histologic changes consistent with HHV-8-associated MCD on biopsy of an enlarged lymph node, and confirmation of HHV-8 infection by LANA-1 lymph node staining or peripheral blood polymerase chain reaction for HHV-8. HIV testing is useful for management, but a positive result is not necessary for to diagnose HHV-8-associated MCD.

=== Classification ===
Castleman disease describes a group of at least three distinct disorders—unicentric Castleman disease (UCD), human herpesvirus 8 associated multicentric Castleman disease (HHV-8-associated MCD), and idiopathic multicentric Castleman disease (iMCD). Identifying the correct subtype of the disease is important, as the three disorders vary significantly in symptoms, clinical findings, disease mechanism, treatment approach, and prognosis.

- In Unicentric Castleman disease enlarged lymph nodes with characteristic microscopic findings are present in only a single lymph node region.
- In the multicentric subtypes of Castleman disease, enlarged lymph nodes with characteristic findings are present in multiple lymph node regions. The multicentric variants of Castleman disease are further classified by known causes of the disease.
  - HHV-8-associated MCD is caused by uncontrolled infection with human herpesvirus 8 (HHV-8, also known as Kaposi sarcoma-associated herpesvirus).
  - In idiopathic multicentric Castleman disease (iMCD) the cause of the disease is unknown (idiopathic). Testing for HHV-8 must be negative to diagnose iMCD.

=== Laboratory testing ===
Laboratory testing may demonstrate low hemoglobin levels (anemia), abnormal platelet counts, low albumin levels, elevated inflammatory markers such as C-Reactive Protein, elevated creatinine (kidney dysfunction), increased levels of immunoglobulins, and elevation of molecules involved in inflammation (cytokines), such as interleukin 6 (IL-6).

=== Medical imaging ===
Radiologic imaging will demonstrate enlarged lymph nodes in multiple regions, which are typically 18F-fluorodoxyglucose (FDG) avid on positron-emission tomography (PET).

=== Pathology ===
Unlike the other subtypes of Castleman disease, UCD and iMCD, which can present with a spectrum of features on microscopic analysis (histology) of tissue biopsied from an enlarged lymph node, only a plasmablastic pattern of histologic features has been described in HHV-8-associated MCD. Plasmablastic features are similar to the plasmacytic features seen in iMCD and UCD, with both demonstrating increased plasma cells in interfollicular spaces. Plasmablastic features are differentiated from plasmacytic features by increased numbers of plasmablasts in follicular mantle zones.

Staining with latency-associated nuclear antigen (LANA-1), a marker for HHV-8 infection, is typically positive.

== Treatment ==
Data regarding treatment for HHV-8-associated MCD is limited and draws on a combination of observational case series and case reports. There have been no randomized controlled trials investigating treatment options for HHV-8-associated MCD. Surgical removal of enlarged lymph nodes, the standard treatment for UCD, is ineffective in HHV-8-associated MCD. Like iMCD, HHV-8-associated MCD is treated with medications. Factors influencing medication selection include disease severity, presence of HIV, presence of Kaposi sarcoma, and response to prior treatments.

Rituximab, a drug that depletes B cells, is the first line agent for patients with HHV-8-associated MCD and is recommended in all patients with proven HHV-8-associated MCD unless they have a contraindication to the medication or have failed treatment with the medication in the past. For patients who present with severe organ dysfunction, develop worsening organ dysfunction despite treatment with Rituximab, or have concurrent Kaposi sarcoma, additional chemotherapeutic agents are added to Rituximab. All patients with HIV should continue or initiate treatment with antiretroviral therapy. Antiviral medications targeted at HHV-8, such as valganciclovir, may be used in patients with poorly controlled HIV or concurrent Kaposi sarcoma.

Rituximab may be discontinued once clinical and laboratory evidence of active disease resolve or continued as maintenance therapy. Patients who responded to Rituximab but have recurrent HHV-8-associated MCD after discontinuing the medication typically respond to retreatment with Rituximab.

=== Follow-up ===
Patients with HHV-8-associated MCD are typically seen at routine intervals for assessment of treatment response and disease progression. Follow-up visits may include evaluation of symptoms, physical examination, laboratory testing, and radiologic imaging.

== Prognosis ==
Outcomes in HHV-8-associated MCD have improved significantly since treatment with rituximab has become more common. In one published case series from an experienced center, observed survival in a cohort of HIV patients with HHV-8-associated MCD was 94% at 2 years and 90% at 5 years.

== Epidemiology ==
No epidemiologic study has been published estimating the incidence for HHV-8-associated MCD in the general population.

While rates of Kaposi sarcoma in HIV patients—which like HHV-8-associated MCD is caused by uncontrolled HHV-8 infection—decreased as treatment with antiretroviral therapy became more common, rates of HHV-8-associated MCD increased over the same time period.

There have been no published epidemiologic studies of Castleman disease outside of the United States; however, rates of HHV-8-associated MCD may vary in different populations based on the prevalence of HHV-8 infection.

== History ==
Castleman disease was first described by Dr. Benjamin Castleman in 1956. In 1995, the association between HHV-8 and Castleman disease was described in patients with HIV. World Castleman Disease Day was established in 2018.

== Culture ==
The Castleman Disease Collaborative Network was founded in 2012 and is the largest organization focused on Castleman disease. It is a global collaborative network involved in research, awareness, and patient support.
