= David Fajgenbaum =

American immunologist, author (born 1985)

David C. Fajgenbaum
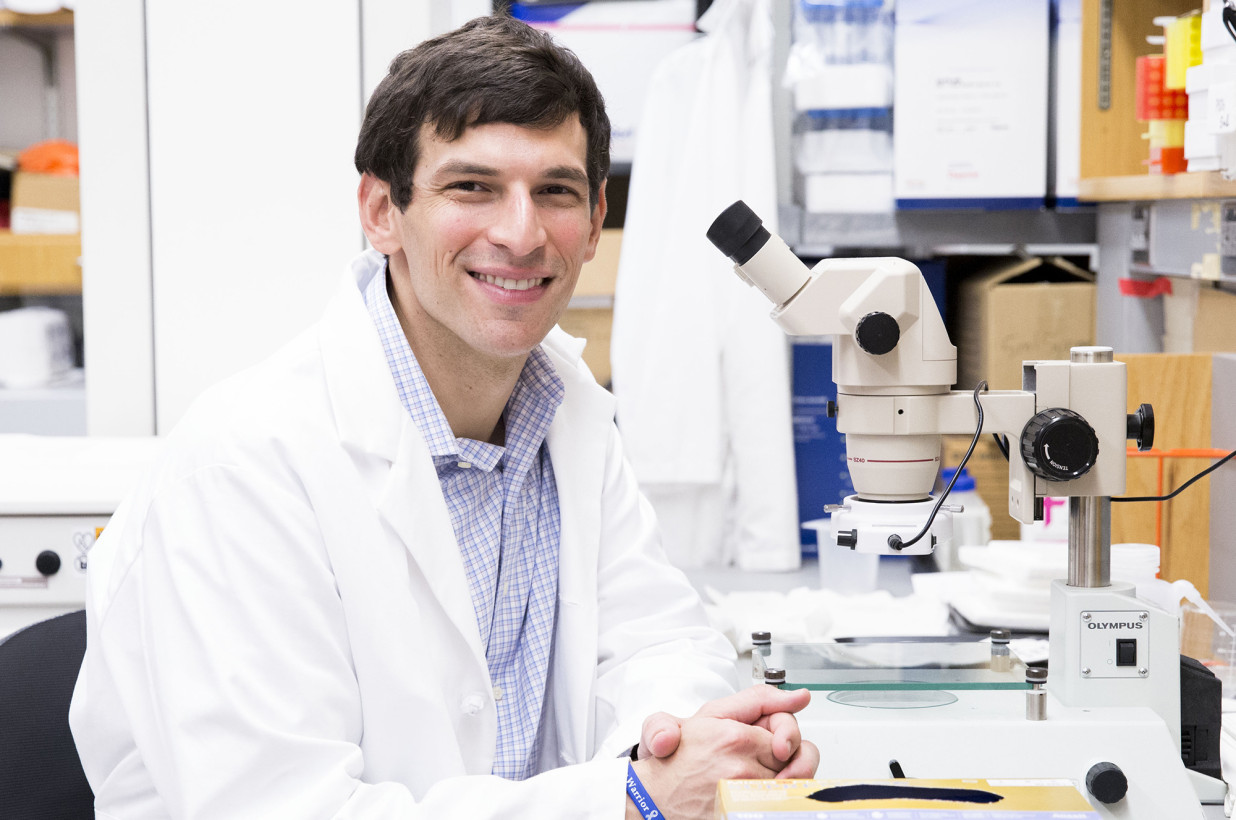
- Fajgenbaum in 2020
- Born: 29 March 1985 (age 41); Raleigh, North Carolina
- Education: Georgetown University (BS); University of Oxford (MSc); University of Pennsylvania (MD, MBA)
- Scientific career
- Fields: Immunology
- Workplaces: University of Pennsylvania; Castleman Disease Collaborative Network

David C. Fajgenbaum (born March 29, 1985) is an American immunology researcher and author who is currently an assistant professor at the Perelman School of Medicine of the University of Pennsylvania. He is best known for his research into Castleman disease.

== Early life and education ==
David C. Fajgenbaum was born on March 29, 1985, in Raleigh, North Carolina, to a physician father and stay-at-home mother. Fajgenbaum played football at Ravenscroft School and aspired to play college football growing up.

He was recruited to Georgetown University to play football. Soon after arriving at college, his mother was diagnosed with glioblastoma. She died in October 2004. In 2005, Fajgenbaum started Actively Moving Forward in memory of his mother to support other grieving college students at Georgetown and on college campuses across the nation.

He received a B.S. from Georgetown University and graduated Omicron Delta Kappa in 2007, M.Sc. from the University of Oxford, M.D. from the Perelman School of Medicine of the University of Pennsylvania in 2013, and M.B.A. from the Wharton School of the University of Pennsylvania in 2015. He volunteered as executive director of Actively Moving Forward Support Network during college and graduate school. While in graduate school, he married his wife Caitlin; the couple has two children.

While in medical school, Fajgenbaum became critically ill with idiopathic multicentric Castleman disease. Following his third relapse in 2012, Fajgenbaum co-founded the Castleman Disease Collaborative Network and began conducting research into idiopathic multicentric Castleman disease.

== Research ==
In 2015, Fajgenbaum joined the Perelman School of Medicine of the University of Pennsylvania as an assistant professor of medicine and associate director of the Orphan Disease Center, where he remains today. Fajgenbaum is the founding director of the Center for Cytokine Storm Treatment & Laboratory, which is focused on unlocking the unknowns of hyperinflammatory diseases and identifying novel treatments for these deadly conditions.

Fajgenbaum has been a pioneer in the field of Castleman disease, most widely known for the identification of a new treatment approach. In 2014, he discovered increased mTOR signaling in idiopathic multicentric Castleman disease and began testing an mTOR inhibitor on himself to assess its efficiency. Fajgenbaum co-authored a review article on Cytokine Storm in the New England Journal of Medicine.

In 2020, Fajgenbaum launched the CORONA Project to identify and advance the most promising treatments for COVID-19.

In 2022, Fajgenbaum co-founded the nonprofit organization, Every Cure, whose mission is to save and improve lives by repurposing drugs. Fajgenbaum announced the launch of Every Cure at the Clinton Global Initiative.

== Books ==
In 2015, Fajgenbaum co-authored and wrote his first book, We Get It: Voices of Grieving College Students and Young Adults. A unique collection of 33 narratives by bereaved students and young adults, We Get It aims to help young adults who are grieving and provide guidance for those who seek to support them.

In September 2019, Fajgenbaum's second book, Chasing My Cure: A Doctor's Race to Turn Hope Into Action, was published. Chasing My Cure is a memoir describing Fajgenbaum's work to spearhead the search for a cure for his disease. According to the Penguin Random House website, Chasing My Cure is a Los Angeles Times and Publishers Weekly bestseller.

== Select awards and honors ==
- 2006 Good Works Team Selection, American Football Coaches Association
- 2007 BRICK Award, Do Something Organization
- 2007 Joseph L. Allbritton Fellowship, Oxford University, Georgetown University President's Office.
- 2007 First-team Academic All-American, USA Today
- 2008 21st Century Gamble Scholarship, University of Pennsylvania Perelman School of Medicine
- 2008 Make it Matter Story of the Month Reader's Digest
- 2012 Welcome Back Award: Community Service, Eli Lilly & National Council for Community Behavioral Healthcare
- 2013 Distinguished Service Award, University of Colorado
- 2015 30 Under 30 List, Healthcare, Forbes Magazine
- 2015 RARE Champion of Hope – Science, Global Genes
- 2016 Young Friends Atlas Award, World Affairs Council of Philadelphia
- 2016 Fellow, College of Physicians of Philadelphia
- 2016 RareVoice Award: Federal Advocacy – Patient Advocate, EveryLife Foundation & Rare Disease Legislative Advocates
- 2017 100 Great Healthcare Leaders to Know, Becker's Hospital Review
- 2018 Young Investigators Draft Awardee, Uplifting Athletes
- 2020 Joseph Wharton Award, Wharton Club of DC
- 2022 Janet Davison Rowley Patient Impact Research Award, Cures Within Reach
- 2022 Service to Science Award, National Disease Research Interchange
- 2022 40 Under 40, Philadelphia Business Journal
- 2024 Philadelphia Citizen of the Year Award, The Philadelphia Citizen
- 2024 Grantee of The Audacious Project (Every Cure), Lead of Every Cure Audacious Project
- 2024 Judson Daland Prize, Patient-oriented Clinical Investigation, American Philosophical Society
- 2025 TIME100 Health List, TIME
