= Glomeruloid hemangioma =

- Specialty: Dermatology

Glomeruloid hemangioma is a distinctive vascular tumor first described in 1990 when found to be associated with POEMS syndrome and Castleman disease. Glomeruloid hemangiomas can manifest as wine-red sessile or pedunculated papules, papulonodules, subcutaneous bluish compressible tumors, or small, firm, reddish-violaceous, dome-shaped papules.

== Signs and symptoms ==
Glomeruloid hemangiomas can manifest as wine-red sessile or pedunculated papules, papulonodules, subcutaneous bluish compressible tumors, or small, firm, reddish-violaceous, dome-shaped papules. They mostly reside on the trunk and proximal limbs and range in size from a few millimeters to a few centimeters in diameter. There have also been rare reports of glomeruloid hemangioma impacting the face. There have also been reports of eruptive angiomatous lesions, which resemble eruptive histiocytomas.

== Causes ==
Glomeruloid hemangiomas are most commonly associated with POEMS syndrome, occurring in up to 45% of individuals with POEMS syndrome. Glomeruloid hemangiomas have also been associated with TAFRO syndrome. Rarely glomeruloid hemangiomas can occur in individuals with no systematic conditions.

== Diagnosis ==
The histopathologic examination displays well-defined, dispersed dermal structures in different sizes that have resemblance to renal glomeruli. The central vessel is bigger and has a sinusoidal appearance, and it is surrounded by a network of small capillary vessels on the periphery.

== See also ==
- POEMS syndrome
- Hemangioma
