= Zinc finger protein 426 =

Protein found in humans

ZNF426

Identifiers
- Aliases: ZNF426, K-RBP, zinc finger protein 426
- External IDs: MGI: 1920248; GeneCards: ZNF426

Gene location (Human)
| Chr. | Chromosome 19 (human) |
| Band | 19p13.2 | Start | 9,523,223 bp |
| Band | 19p13.2 | End | 9,538,645 bp |

Gene location (Mouse)
| Chr. | Chromosome 9 (mouse) |
| Band | 9 A3|9 7.55 cM | Start | 20,379,845 bp |
| Band | 9 A3|9 7.55 cM | End | 20,404,042 bp |
RNA expression pattern
| Bgee | Human / Mouse (ortholog); Top expressed in: oocyte; secondary oocyte; oral cavity; amniotic fluid; parotid gland; epithelium of esophagus; retinal pigment epithelium; vena cava; Achilles tendon; sperm / Top expressed in: tail of embryo; genital tubercle; zygote; spermatid; ventricular zone; spermatocyte; granulocyte; lens; Rostral migratory stream; neural layer of retina; More reference expression data |
| BioGPS | n/a |
Gene ontology
| Molecular function | DNA binding; protein binding; metal ion binding; nucleic acid binding; DNA-binding transcription factor activity, RNA polymerase II-specific |
| Cellular component | intracellular anatomical structure; nucleus |
| Biological process | regulation of transcription, DNA-templated; transcription, DNA-templated; regulation of transcription by RNA polymerase II |
Sources:Amigo / QuickGO
Orthologs
| Databases | NCBI: entry; OMA: entry |
| Species | Human | Mouse |
| Entrez | 79088 | 235028 |
| Ensembl | ENSG00000130818 | ENSMUSG00000059475 |
| UniProt | Q9BUY5 | Q8R1D1 |
| RefSeq (mRNA) | NM_001300883; NM_024106; NM_001318055; NM_001318056 | NM_001110309; NM_146221; NM_001310742 |
| RefSeq (protein) | NP_001287812; NP_001304984; NP_001304985; NP_077011 | NP_001103779; NP_001297671; NP_666333 |
| Location (UCSC) | Chr 19: 9.52 – 9.54 Mb | Chr 9: 20.38 – 20.4 Mb |
| PubMed search |
- Wikidata
| View/Edit Human | View/Edit Mouse |

Zinc finger protein 426 is a protein that in humans is encoded by the ZNF426 gene.

== Function ==
Kaposi's sarcoma-associated herpesvirus (KSHV) can be reactivated from latency by the viral protein RTA. The protein encoded by this gene is a zinc finger transcriptional repressor that interacts with RTA to modulate RTA-mediated reactivation of KSHV. While the encoded protein can repress KSHV reactivation, RTA can induce degradation of this protein through the ubiquitin-proteasome pathway to overcome the repression. Several transcript variants encoding different isoforms have been found for this gene.
