= TAFRO syndrome =

Rare human systemic disease

TAFRO syndrome is a rare human systemic disease. The name is formed from the initials of thrombocytopenia, anasarca, fever, reticulin fibrosis and organomegaly. It was first described, in three patients, in 2010 by Takei et al, and was discussed at two meetings held in 2012.

It has "significant overlap" with Castleman's disease but "[its] features warrant its classification as a separate subtype of idiopathic multicentric Castleman's disease (iMCD)".

It was reported in 2025 that Anakinra had been used successfully in two cases of paediatric TAFRO syndrome.
