= MSin3 interaction domain =

Protein domain

The mSin3 interaction domain (SID) is an interaction domain which is present on several transcriptional repressor proteins including TGFβ (transforming growth factor β) and Mad. It interacts with the paired amphipathic alpha-helix 2 (PAH2) domain of mSin3, a transcriptional repressor domain that is attached to transcription repressor proteins such as the mSin3A corepressor.

Action of histone deacetylase 1 and 2 (HDAC1/2) is induced by the interaction of mSin3A with a multi-protein complex containing HDAC1/2. Transcription is also repressed by histone deacetylase-independent means.
