= Castleman Disease Collaborative Network =

Health advocacy group

The Castleman Disease Collaborative Network (CDCN) is an organization focused on research and awareness of Castleman disease. It was founded in 2012 and has used a collaborative network approach to advance several research studies on Castleman disease.

== History ==
The Castleman Disease Collaborative Network was founded in 2012 by Dr. Frits van Rhee and Dr. David Fajgenbaum, after Fajgenbaum was diagnosed with idiopathic multicentric Castleman disease as a medical student in 2010. Soon after its creation, the CDCN merged with the Castleman's Awareness and Research Effort (CARE).

Fajgenbaum has served as the executive director of the CDCN since its founding.

== Activities ==
=== Research ===
The CDCN provides grant funding to support research on the etiology, pathogenesis, diagnosis, and management of Castleman disease. The CDCN is involved in longitudinal research initiatives designed to facilitate multiple projects.

==== ACCELERATE Natural History Study ====
The ACCELERATE (Accelerating Castleman Care with an Electronic Longitudinal registry, E-Repository, And Treatment Effectiveness research) natural history study is a collaborative project between the CDCN, Janssen Pharmaceuticals, and the University of Pennsylvania. It is a database of clinical information drawn from patients diagnosed with Castleman disease and includes symptoms, laboratory tests, imaging, pathology, and treatment approaches. The ACCELERATE study was designed to document the natural history of Castleman disease, range of clinical features associated with the disease, and response to treatment. Patients can enroll themselves in the ACCELERATE study online.

==== Castlebank ====
The Castlebank is a collaboration between the CDCN and the University of Pennsylvania to house a centralized biobank of tissue samples donated by patients with Castleman disease and collected from researcher around the world. The Castlebank is used to support collaborative research projects requiring tissue samples.

==== Drug Repurposing ====
The CDCN is committed to the discovery of new uses for existing drugs. Frits van Rhee and David Fajgenbaum discovered that "a drug that had been on the market for many years–Sirolimus–could be repurposed to fight Castleman Disease." The drug saved Fajgenbaum's life.

The CDCN has pioneered the following approach to drug repurposing (giving a drug for a use other than what it is approved for): 1) perform studies of biospecimens to identify cell types, signaling pathways, and genes/proteins that may be involved, 2) validate the discovery, 3) use bioinformatic tools and drug databases to identify drugs already FDA-approved for another condition that modulate the target, 4) administer the drug off-label or through a clinical trial, and 5) track the impact of the drug on the given disease.

== The CORONA Project ==
In early 2020, the CDCN launched the CORONA (Covid Registry of Off-label and New Agents) project. CORONA is a publicly available central repository of therapies administered to COVID-19 patients dating back to the start of the global pandemic. The goal of the project is to highlight trends in the use and reported effectiveness of therapies, and to facilitate the identification of promising therapies that may be further investigated in clinical trials.

Data for the CORONA project is provided by a team of volunteers who work to review papers published on COVID-19. Volunteers extract names of the drugs administered to COVID-19 patients, the number of patients who were treated with each drug, and the reported clinical outcomes of the patients who were treated. The data is shared with collaborators in order to facilitate creation of well-powered randomized controlled trials of these agents.

Phase I (Complete)

Phase I of the CORONA project was completed in March 2020. Over 2500 papers were reviewed, resulting in extraction of 115 repurposed drugs administered to over 9,000 COVID-19 patients. These efforts resulted in the publication of a systematic literature review, Treatments Administered to the First 9152 Reported Cases of COVID-19: A Systematic Review, in Infectious Diseases and Therapy.

Phase II (Ongoing)

The team of volunteers continues to maintain an updated listing of all treatments reported to be used in COVID-19 patients from papers published in PubMed.
