= LANA =

Protein

The latency-associated nuclear antigen (LANA-1) or latent nuclear antigen (LNA, LNA-1) is a Kaposi's sarcoma-associated herpesvirus (KSHV) latent protein initially found by Moore and colleagues as a speckled nuclear antigen present in primary effusion lymphoma cells that reacts with antibodies from patients with KS. It is the most immunodominant KSHV protein identified by Western-blotting as 222–234 kDa double bands migrate slower than the predicted molecular weight. LANA has been suspected of playing a crucial role in modulating viral and cellular gene expression. It is commonly used as an antigen in blood tests to detect antibodies in persons that have been exposed to KSHV.

KSHV or Human herpesvirus 8 (HHV-8) has been identified as the etiological agent of Kaposi’s sarcoma (KS) and certain AIDS-associated lymphomas. As KSHV establishes latent infection in tumorous foci, it invariably expresses high levels of the viral LANA protein, which is necessary and sufficient to maintain the KSHV episome.

Encoded by ORF73, LANA-1 is one of few HHV-8 encoded proteins that is highly expressed in all latently infected tumour cells; specifically, it is a phosphoprotein with an acidic internal repeat domain flanked by a carboxy-terminal domain and an amino-terminal domain. LANA-1 acts as a transcriptional regulator, and it has been implicated directly in oncogenesis because of its ability to bind to the tumour-suppressing protein p53 and to the retinoblastoma protein pRb. This leads to the inactivation of p53-dependent promoters and induction of E2F-dependent genes.

Studies have also shown that LANA-1 can transactivate the promoter of the reverse transcriptase subunit of the human telomerase holoenzyme, thus overextending a critical step in cellular transformation. Paradoxically, LANA-1 has been shown to be involved in transcriptional repression and can, moreover, interact with the mSin3/HDAC1 co-repressor complex.

It has been also shown to interact with and inhibit the ATF4/CREB2 transcription factor that interacts with the basic transcription machinery and to bind with two human chromosome-associated cellular proteins, MeCP2 and DEK.

LANA-1 is associated with cellular chromatin and stays on the chromosomes during cell division. It maintains the viral genomes during cell division by tethering the viral episomes to the chromosomes. It binds directly to replication origin recognition complexes (ORCs) that are primarily associated with the terminal repeat (TR) region of the HHV-8 genome.
