= Kaposi's sarcoma =

Cancer of the skin, integumentary lymph nodes, or other organs

Kaposi's sarcoma, multiple haemorrhagic sarcoma
- Characteristic purple lesions of Kaposi's sarcoma on the nose of an HIV-positive woman
- Pronunciation: /kæˈpoʊsiz/, /ˈkɑːpəsiz, ˈkæpə-/
- Specialty: Dermatology, oncology
- Symptoms: Purple colored skin lesions
- Types: Classic, endemic, immunosuppression therapy-related, epidemic
- Risk factors: Human herpesvirus 8 (HHV8), poor immune function
- Diagnostic method: Tissue biopsy, medical imaging
- Differential diagnosis: Blue rubber bleb nevus syndrome, pyogenic granuloma, melanocytic nevi, melanoma
- Treatment: Surgery, chemotherapy, radiation therapy, biologic therapy
- Frequency: 42,000 (new cases, 2018)
- Deaths: 20,000 (2018)

Kaposi's sarcoma (KS) is a type of cancer that can form masses on the skin, in lymph nodes, in the mouth, or in other organs. The skin lesions are usually painless, purple, and may be flat or raised. Lesions can occur singly, multiply in a limited area, or may be widespread. Depending on the sub-type of disease and level of immune suppression, KS may worsen either gradually or quickly. Except for classic KS where there is generally no immune suppression, KS is caused by a combination of immune suppression (such as HIV/AIDS) and infection by Human herpesvirus 8 (HHV8 – also called KS-associated herpesvirus (KSHV)).

Classic, endemic, immunosuppression therapy-related (also known as iatrogenic), and epidemic (also known as AIDS-related) sub-types are all described. Classic KS tends to affect older men in regions where KSHV is highly prevalent (Mediterranean, Eastern Europe, Middle East), is usually slow-growing, and most often affects only the legs. Endemic KS is most common in Sub-Saharan Africa and is more aggressive in children, while older adults present similarly to classic KS. Immunosuppression therapy-related KS generally occurs in people following organ transplantation and mostly affects the skin. Epidemic KS occurs in people with AIDS and many parts of the body can be affected. KS is diagnosed by tissue biopsy, while the extent of disease may be determined by medical imaging.

Treatment is based on the sub-type, whether the condition is localized or widespread, and the person's immune function. Localized skin lesions may be treated by surgery, injections of chemotherapy into the lesion, or radiation therapy. Widespread disease may be treated with chemotherapy or biologic therapy. In those with HIV/AIDS, highly active antiretroviral therapy (HAART) prevents and often treats KS. In certain cases the addition of chemotherapy may be required. With widespread disease, death may occur.

The condition is relatively common in people with HIV/AIDS and following organ transplants. Over 35% of people with AIDS may be affected. KS was first described by Moritz Kaposi in 1872, but the name was coined only in 1891. It became more widely known as one of the AIDS-defining illnesses in the 1980s. KSHV was discovered as a causative agent in 1994.

== Signs and symptoms ==
KS lesions are nodules or blotches that may be red, purple, brown, or black, and are usually papular.

They are typically found on the skin, but spread elsewhere is common, especially the mouth, gastrointestinal tract, and respiratory tract. Growth can range from very slow to explosively fast and is associated with significant mortality and morbidity.

The lesions are painless but become cosmetically disfiguring or interruptive to organs.

=== Skin ===
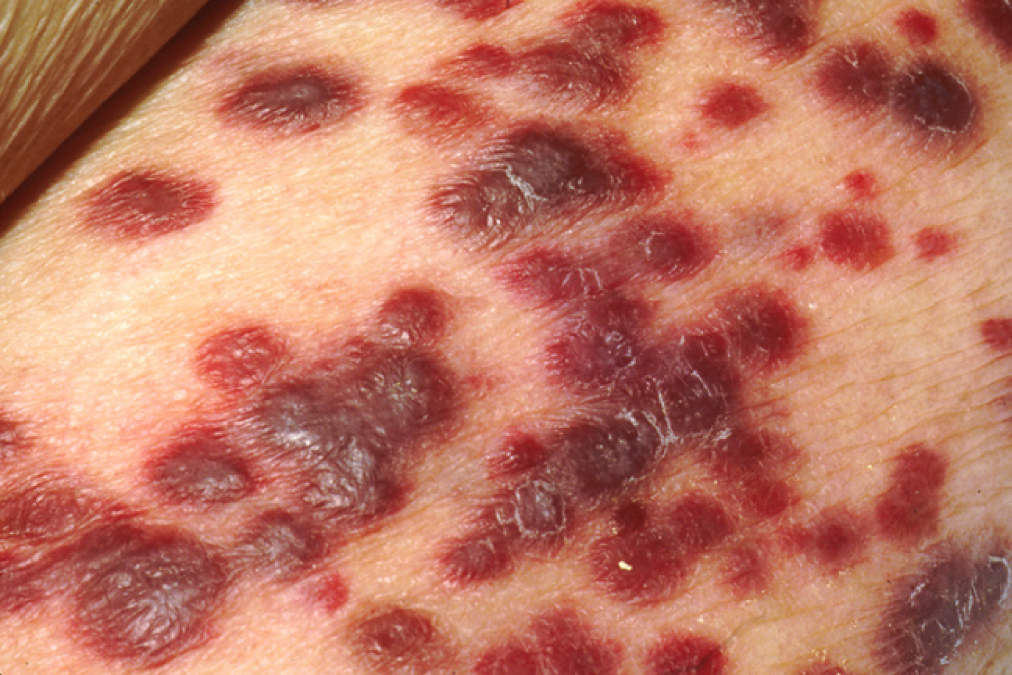
An example of Kaposi's sarcoma

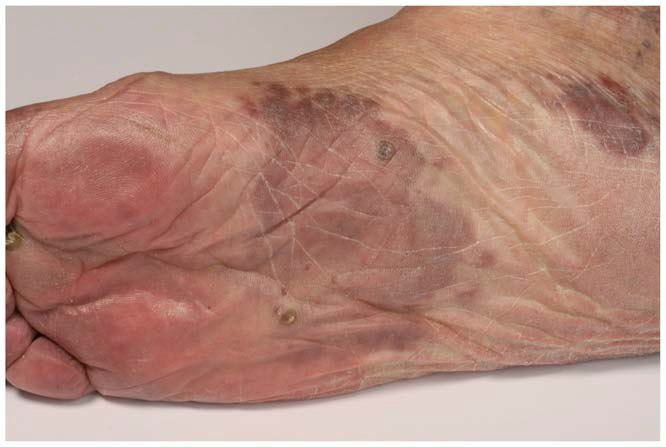
Patch stage Kaposi's sarcoma. Red to brownish irregularly shaped macules and plaques.

Commonly affected areas include the lower limbs, back, face, mouth, and genitalia. The lesions are usually as described above, but may occasionally be plaque-like (often on the soles of the feet) or even involved in skin breakdown with resulting fungating lesions. Associated swelling may be from either local inflammation or lymphoedema (obstruction of local lymphatic vessels by the lesion). Kaposi's sarcoma skin lesions may be psychologically distressing.

=== Mouth ===
An HIV-positive person presenting with a Kaposi's sarcoma lesion with an overlying candidiasis infection in their mouth

The mouth is involved in about 30% of cases and is the initial site in 15% of AIDS-related KS. In the mouth, the hard palate is most frequently affected, followed by the gums. Lesions in the mouth may be easily damaged by chewing and bleed or develop secondary infection, and even interfere with eating or speaking.

=== Gastrointestinal tract ===
Involvement can be common in those with transplant-related or AIDS-related KS, and it may occur in the absence of skin involvement. The gastrointestinal lesions may be silent or cause weight loss, pain, nausea/vomiting, diarrhea, bleeding (either vomiting blood or passing it with bowel movements), malabsorption, or intestinal obstruction.

=== Respiratory tract ===
Involvement of the airway can present with shortness of breath, fever, cough, coughing up blood, or chest pain, or as an incidental finding on chest x-ray. The diagnosis is usually confirmed by bronchoscopy when the lesions are directly seen and often biopsied. Kaposi's sarcoma of the lung has a poor prognosis.

== Cause ==
Kaposi's sarcoma-associated herpesvirus (KSHV), also called HHV-8, is present in almost 100% of Kaposi sarcoma lesions, whether HIV-related, classic, endemic, or iatrogenic. KSHV encodes oncogenes, microRNAs and circular RNAs that promote cancer cell proliferation and escape from the immune system.

=== Transmission ===
In Europe and North America, KSHV is transmitted through saliva. Thus, kissing is a risk factor for transmission. Higher rates of transmission among gay and bisexual men have been attributed to "deep kissing" sexual partners with KSHV. Another alternative theory suggests that use of saliva as a sexual lubricant might be a major mode for transmission. Prudent advice is to use commercial lubricants when needed and avoid deep kissing with partners with KSHV infection or whose status is unknown.

KSHV is also transmissible via organ transplantation and blood transfusion. Testing for the virus before these procedures is likely to effectively limit iatrogenic transmission.

== Pathology ==
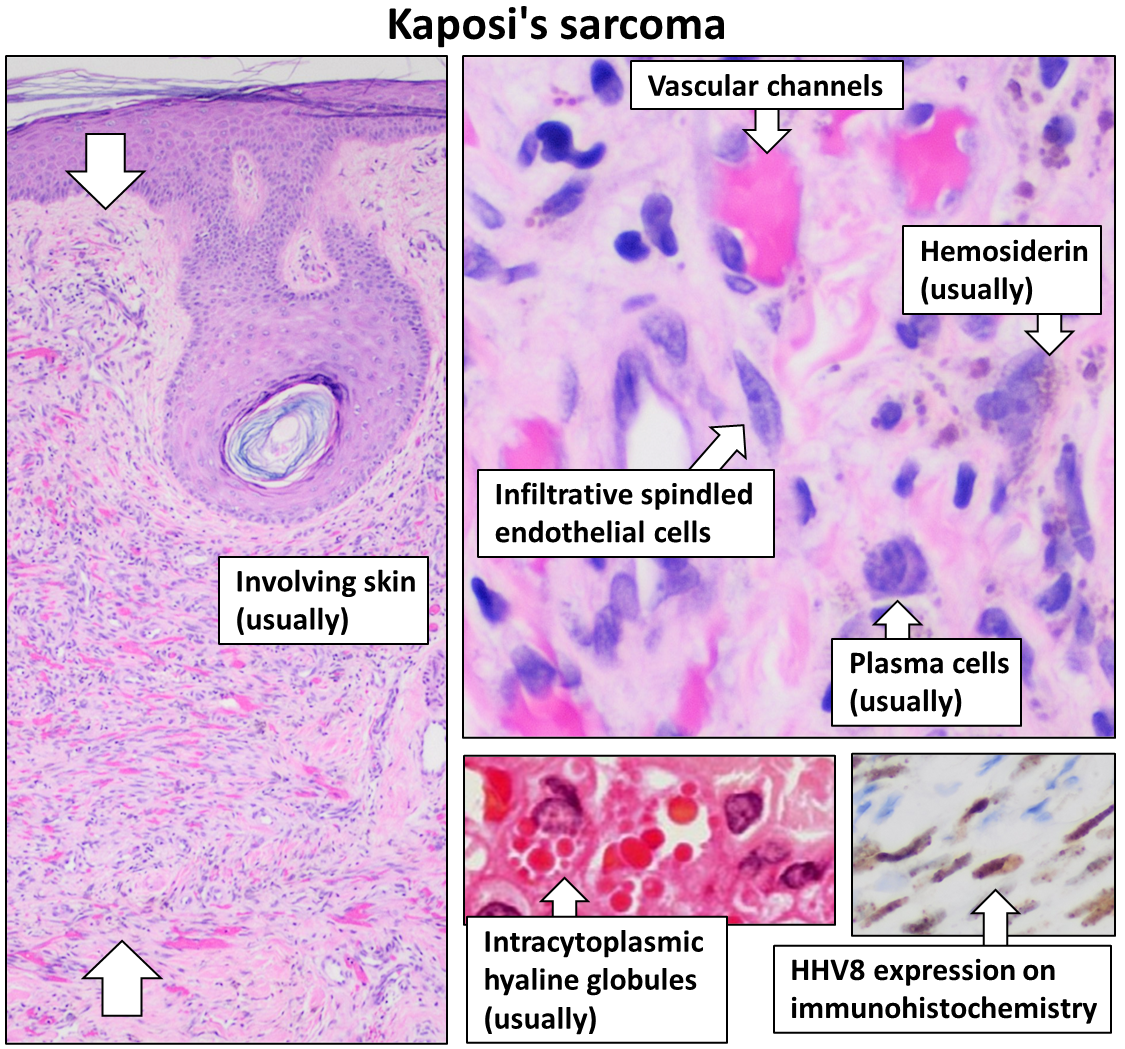
Micrograph of a Kaposi sarcoma showing its typical features.

Despite its name, in general it is not considered a true sarcoma, which is a tumor arising from mesenchymal tissue. The histogenesis of KS remains controversial. KS may arise as a cancer of lymphatic endothelium and forms vascular channels that fill with blood cells, giving the tumor its characteristic bruise-like appearance. KSHV proteins are uniformly detected in KS cancer cells.

KS lesions contain tumor cells with a characteristic abnormal elongated shape, called spindle cells. The most typical feature of Kaposi sarcoma is the presence of spindle cells forming slits containing red blood cells. Mitotic activity is only moderate and pleomorphism is usually absent. The tumor is highly vascular, containing abnormally dense and irregular blood vessels, which leak red blood cells into the surrounding tissue and give the tumor its dark color. Inflammation around the tumor may produce swelling and pain. Variously sized PAS positive hyaline bodies are often seen in the cytoplasm or sometimes extracellularly.

The spindle cells of Kaposi sarcoma differentiate toward endothelial cells, probably of lymph vessel rather than blood vessel origin. The consistent immunoreactivity for podoplanin supports the lymphatic nature of the lesion.

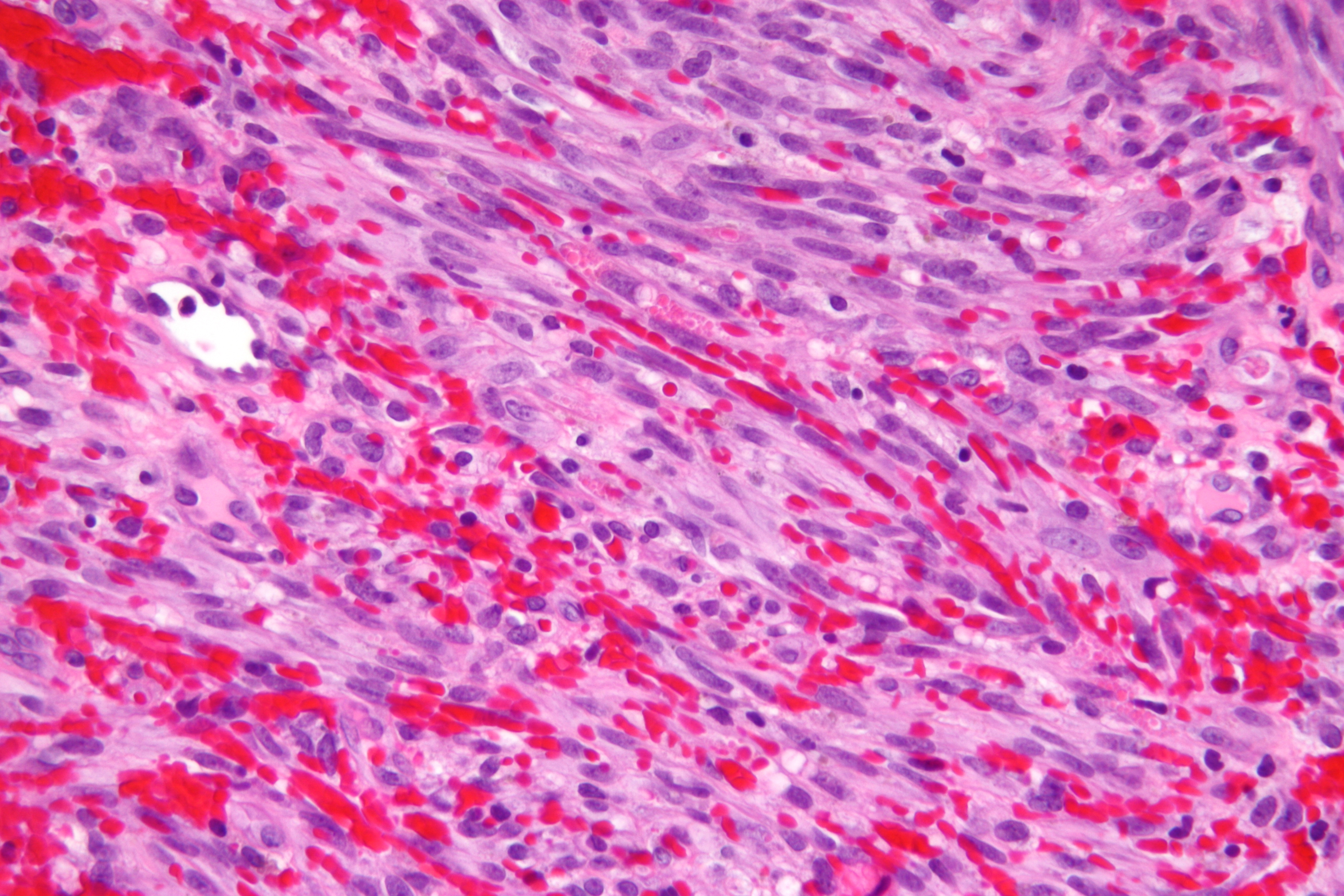
Micrograph of a Kaposi sarcoma showing the characteristic spindle cells, high vascularity, and intracellular hyaline globs. H&E stain.

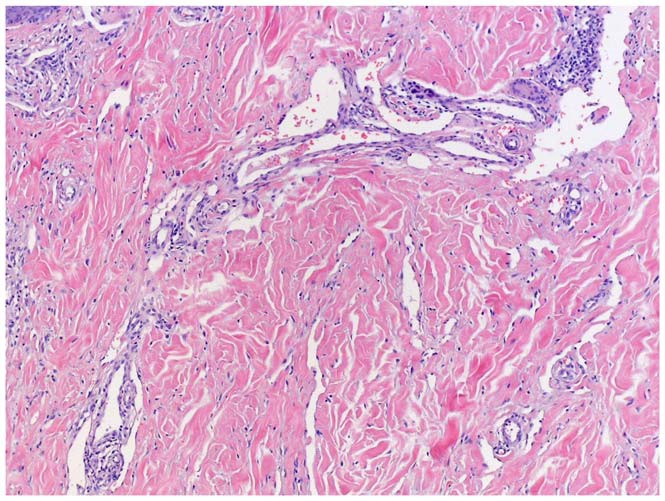
Micrograph of promontory sign in Kaposi's sarcoma in patch stage. Dilated irregular vascular channels surround a pre-existing vessel.

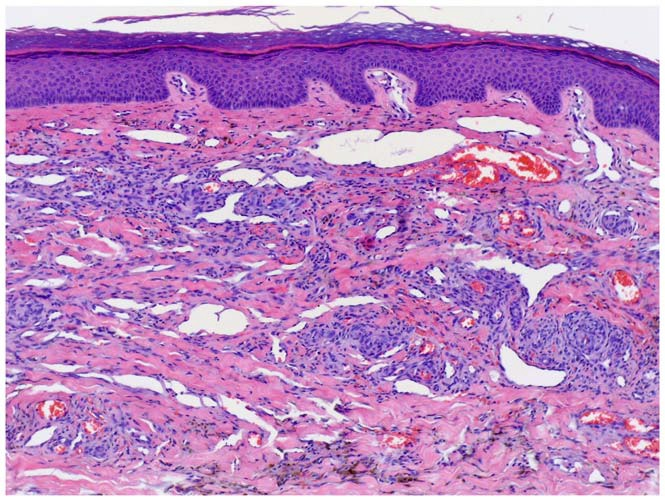
Micrograph of plaque stage, with bizarre vessels dissecting the upper dermis. There is erythrocyte extravasation and hemosiderin pigmentation.

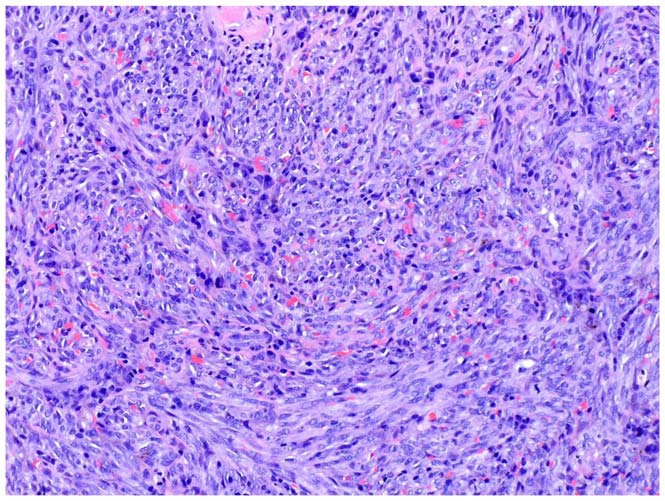
Micrograph of tumor stage. Well-circumscribed spindle-cell tumor. Erythrocytes lie within poorly defined slit-like vascular spaces.

== Diagnosis ==
Although KS may be suspected from the appearance of lesions and the patient's risk factors, a definite diagnosis can be made only by biopsy and microscopic examination. Detection of the KSHV protein LANA in tumor cells confirms the diagnosis.

In differential diagnosis, arteriovenous malformations, pyogenic granuloma and other vascular proliferations can be microscopically confused with KS.

=== Differential diagnosis of Kaposi's sarcoma ===
1. Naevus (moles)
2. Histiocytoma
3. Cryptococcosis
4. Histoplasmosis
5. Leishmaniasis
6. Pneumocystis lesions
7. Dermatophytosis
8. Angioma
9. Bacillary angiomatosis
10. Pyogenic granuloma
11. Melanoma

=== Classification ===
HHV-8 is responsible for all varieties of KS. Since Moritz Kaposi first described the cancer, the disease has been reported in five separate clinical settings, with different presentations, epidemiology, and prognoses. All of the forms are infected with KSHV and are different manifestations of the same disease but have differences in clinical aggressiveness, prognosis, and treatment.

- Classic Kaposi sarcoma most commonly appears early on the toes and soles as reddish, violaceous, or bluish-black macules and patches that spread and coalesce to form nodules or plaques. A small percentage of these patients may have visceral lesions. In most cases, the treatment involves surgical removal of the lesion. The condition tends to be indolent and chronic, affecting elderly men from the Mediterranean region, Arab countries, or of Eastern European descent. Israeli Jews have a higher rate of KSHV/HHV-8 infection than European peoples.
- Endemic KS, which has two types. Although this may be present worldwide, it has been originally described later in young African peoples, mainly those from sub-Saharan Africa. This variant is not related to HIV infection and is a more aggressive disease that infiltrates the skin extensively.
  - African lymphadenopathic Kaposi sarcoma is aggressive, occurring in children under 10 years of age, presenting with lymph node involvement, with or without skin lesions.
  - African cutaneous Kaposi sarcoma presents with nodular, infiltrative, vascular masses on the extremities, mostly in men between the ages of 20 and 50, and is endemic in tropical Africa.
- Immunosuppression-associated Kaposi sarcoma had been described, but only rarely until the advent of calcineurin inhibitors (such as ciclosporines, which are inhibitors of T-cell function) for transplant patients in the 1980s, when its incidence grew rapidly. The tumor arises either when an HHV 8-infected organ is transplanted into someone who has not been exposed to the virus or when the transplant recipient already harbors pre-existing HHV 8 infection. Unlike classic Kaposi sarcoma, the site of presentation is more variable.
- AIDS-associated Kaposi sarcoma typically presents with cutaneous lesions that begin as one or several red to purple-red macules, rapidly progressing to papules, nodules, and plaques, with a predilection for the head, back, neck, trunk, and mucous membranes. In more advanced cases, lesions can be found in the stomach and intestines, the lymph nodes, and the lungs. Compared to other forms of KS, KS-AIDS stimulated more interest in KS research, as it was one of the first illnesses associated with AIDS and first described in 1981. This form of KS is over 300 times more common in AIDS patients than in renal transplant recipients. In this case, HHV 8 is sexually transmitted among people also at risk for sexually transmitted HIV infection.

== Prevention ==
Blood tests to detect antibodies against KSHV have been developed and can be used to determine whether a person is at risk for transmitting the infection to their sexual partner, or whether an organ is infected before transplantation. However, these tests are not available except as research tools, and, thus, there is little screening for persons at risk for becoming infected with KSHV, such as people following a transplant.

== Treatment ==
Kaposi sarcoma is not curable, but it can often be treatable for many years. In KS associated with immunodeficiency or immunosuppression, treating the cause of the immune system dysfunction can slow or stop the progression of KS. In 40% or more of patients with AIDS-associated Kaposi sarcoma, the Kaposi lesions will shrink upon first starting highly active antiretroviral therapy (HAART). Therefore, HAART is considered the cornerstone of therapy in AIDS-associated Kaposi sarcoma. However, in a certain percentage of such people, Kaposi sarcoma may recur after many years on HAART, especially if HIV is not completely suppressed.

People with a few local lesions can often be treated with local measures such as radiation therapy or cryosurgery. Weak evidence suggests that antiretroviral therapy in combination with chemotherapy is more effective than either of those two therapies individually. Limited basic and clinical evidence suggest that topical beta-blockers, such as timolol, may induce regression of localized lesions in classic as well as HIV-associated Kaposi sarcoma. In general, surgery is not recommended, as Kaposi sarcoma can appear in wound edges. In general, more widespread disease, or disease affecting internal organs, is treated with systemic therapy with interferon alpha, liposomal anthracyclines (such as liposomal doxorubicin or daunorubicin), thalidomide, or paclitaxel.

Alitretinoin, applied to the lesion, may be used when the lesion is not getting better with standard treatment of HIV/AIDS, and chemotherapy or radiation therapy cannot be used.

== Society ==
Because of their highly visible nature, external lesions are sometimes the presenting symptom of AIDS. Kaposi sarcoma entered the awareness of the general public with the release of the film Philadelphia, in which the main character was fired after his employers found out he was HIV-positive due to visible lesions. By the time KS lesions appear, likely, the immune system has already been severely weakened. It has been reported that only 6% of men who have sex with men are aware that KS is caused by a virus different from HIV. Thus, there is little community effort to prevent KSHV infection. Likewise, no systematic screening of organ donations is in place.

In people with AIDS, Kaposi sarcoma is considered an opportunistic infection, a disease that can gain a foothold in the body because the immune system has been weakened. With the rise of HIV/AIDS in Africa, where KSHV is widespread, KS has become the most frequently reported cancer in some countries.
