= Benjamin Castleman =

American pathologist

- Born: May 17, 1906; Everett, Massachusetts
- Died: June 29, 1982 (aged 76); Boston, Massachusetts
- Citizenship: U.S.
- Education: Harvard University (B.A.) & Yale University School of Medicine (M.D.)
- Known for: Research in Pathology
- Scientific career
- Fields: Medicine & Pathology

Benjamin Castleman (May 17, 1906, Everett, Massachusetts – June 29, 1982, Boston, Massachusetts) was an American physician and pathologist best known for describing Castleman's disease (angiofollicular lymphoid hyperplasia). He was also one of the authors of the first case series on pulmonary alveolar proteinosis in a 1958 article in The New England Journal of Medicine. ("Rosen–Castleman–Liebow syndrome" is a rarely used term for that condition.) Castleman undertook clinicopathologic investigations of parathyroid disease and wrote several important papers on diseases of the thymus and mediastinum. He wrote, or collaborated in writing, over 100 scholarly papers on a variety of disorders.

Castleman grew up in a Jewish household. He received a B.A. degree in 1927 from Harvard University and an M.D. degree in 1931 at Yale University. He worked for many years at the Massachusetts General Hospital in Boston, serving as chief of the division of anatomic pathology there, and he held the rank of Professor of Pathology in the Harvard Medical School. Castleman was an editor of the clinicopathological case presentation series in The New England Journal of Medicine.

The Benjamin Castleman Award has been bestowed annually since 1982 to the first author of an English-language research article that is considered the most worthy in the field of human pathology. It is administered by the United States and Canadian Academy of Pathology.

Castleman died of lymphoma in June 1982 and is buried in Boston, MA.

== See also ==
- Pathology
- List of pathologists
