= Mantle zone =

Part of a lymph node

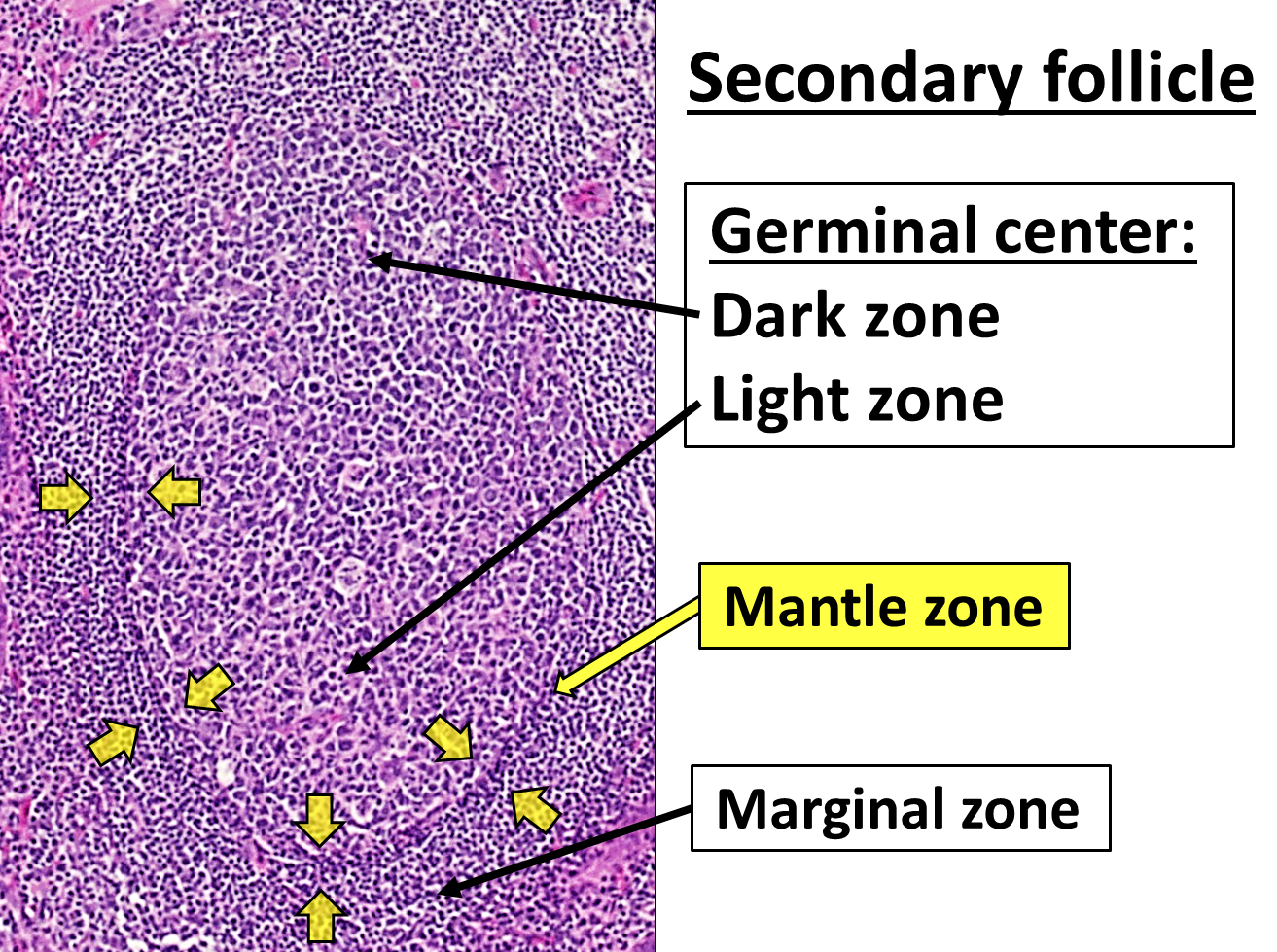
- Histology of a normal secondary lymphoid follicle, with yellow arrows pointing at the mantle zone.

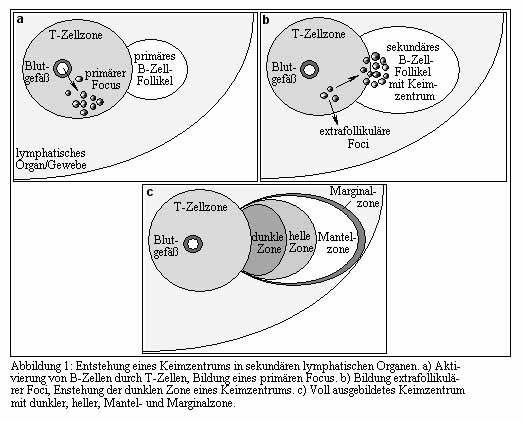
Image labeled in German, but "Mantel-zone" visible near center

The mantle zone (or just mantle) of a lymphatic nodule (or lymphatic follicle) is an outer ring of small lymphocytes surrounding a germinal center.

It is also known as the "corona".

It contains transient lymphocytes.

It is the location of the lymphoma in mantle cell lymphoma.

== Pathology ==
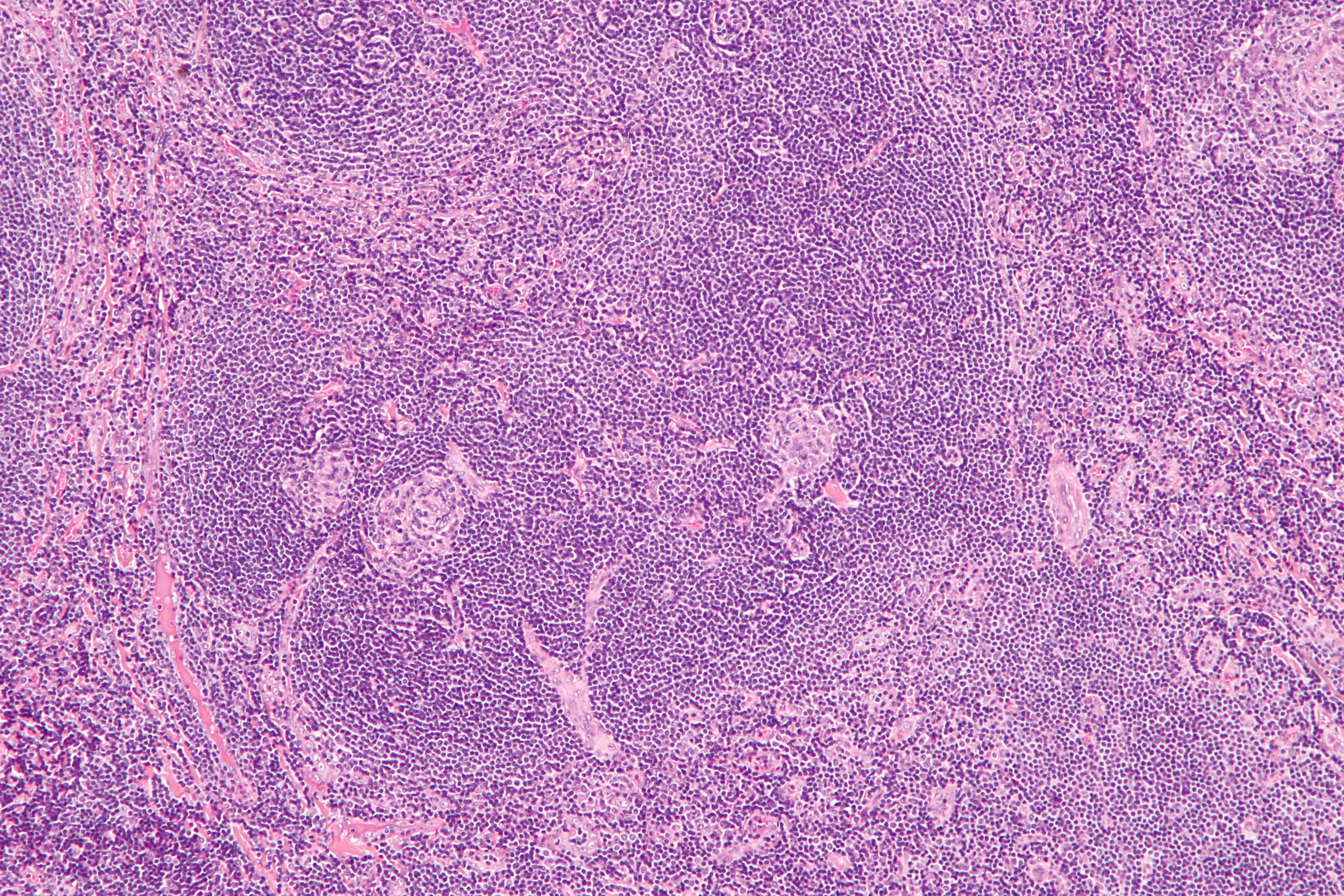
Intermediate magnification micrograph of Castleman disease showing the characteristic expansion of the mantle zone. H&E stain

Mantle zone expansion may be seen in benign, such as Castleman disease, and malignancy, i.e., Mantle cell lymphoma. Tcl-1 is expressed in the mantle zone.
