= Plasmacytosis =

Plasmacytosis is a condition in which there is an unusually large proportion of plasma cells in tissues, exudates, or blood. Plasmacytosis may be divided into two types—cutaneous and systemic—both of which have identical skin findings. Patients with plasmacytosis have been predominantly found to have lung infections (pneumonia, tuberculosis, abscess) whereas multiple myeloma is rarely found.

== Definition and causes ==
Plasmacytosis is defined as an unusual increase in plasma cells in the blood or bone marrow, indicating a range of medical issues. Batool et al. (2022) explains that it can be either reactive or neoplastic. Reactive plasmacytosis happens due to infections, autoimmune diseases, or inflammation. Neoplastic plasmacytosis is mostly found in blood cancers like multiple myeloma and other similar disorders. The causes of reactive plasmacytosis vary since the plasma cells play a key part in immune response, while neoplastic causes result from the abnormal growth of plasma cells (de Toro & Fernandez-Pol, 2024). It is essential for doctors to determine if the plasmacytosis is reactive or neoplastic. This is needed because the treatment and management will vary depending on the cause. This difference will also change how the diagnosis is made and the expected outcome.

== Symptoms and diagnosis ==
Clinical and laboratory diagnosis of plasmacytosis involves looking at specific symptoms and increased plasma cells. Symptoms include feeling tired, bone pain, and frequent infections, similar to signs in multiple myeloma patients (Pham & Mahindra, 2019). Laboratory tests check for unusual blood counts and abnormal protein levels linked to plasma cell growth. Also, a bone marrow biopsy can show plasma cell infiltration while X-rays like MRI and CT scans find bone damage. These are key parts of diagnosing plasmacytosis (Saldarriaga et al., 2023).

In some cases, plasmacytosis may present in an unusual manner, complicating the diagnostic process. For instance, extreme peripheral blood plasmacytosis can mimic conditions such as plasma cell leukemia, as seen in a case involving a 62-year-old male with angioimmunoblastic T-cell lymphoma (AITL) (Sokol et al., 2019). This patient exhibited symptoms like progressive cervical adenopathy, fevers, and weight loss, which are common in various lymphoproliferative disorders, thus making the diagnosis challenging. With investigation through samples and symptoms, researchers have been able to accurately distinguish reactive and neoplastic plasmacytosis, as well as other disorders that may display themselves similarly.

Advancements in the understanding and treatment of plasmacytosis highlight the specific therapeutic approaches that are currently coming out, bringing renewed hope for patient care. Recent studies emphasize the potential benefits of precision medicine, encouraging treatments that are fine-tuned to target specific anomalies within plasma cells rather than applying a broad-spectrum approach. This strategy is particularly pertinent in dealing with soft-tissue plasmacytomas, where innovative methods aim to eradicate the tumor effectively and prevent further disease progression (Rosiñol et al., 2021). New treatments often involve novel drugs and therapeutic regimens that work in conjunction with or as alternatives to traditional chemotherapy or corticosteroid interventions, thereby minimizing adverse effects. By integrating these newer therapies into existing frameworks, healthcare providers can enhance patient outcomes, ensuring not just survival but improved quality of life as well.

== Treatments ==
The usual use of corticosteroids in anti-inflammatory treatments and chemotherapy is advancing. Alongside these traditional methods that remain effective, the focus now is on molecular biology, addressing problems with harmful plasma cells and the molecules that help them grow, using some distinctive or innovative methods separately. This situation allows for personalized treatment for each patient, rather than using standardized care plans, while still following specific medical and health guidelines.

Testing with labs and imaging can help diagnose it, and treatment options can be chosen based on the patient’s situation. Managing plasmacytosis shows how vital both old and new treatments are for improving the patient’s outcome and quality of life.

== See also ==
- Cutaneous B-cell lymphoma
- Multiple myeloma
- Plasmacytoma
- Skin lesion
