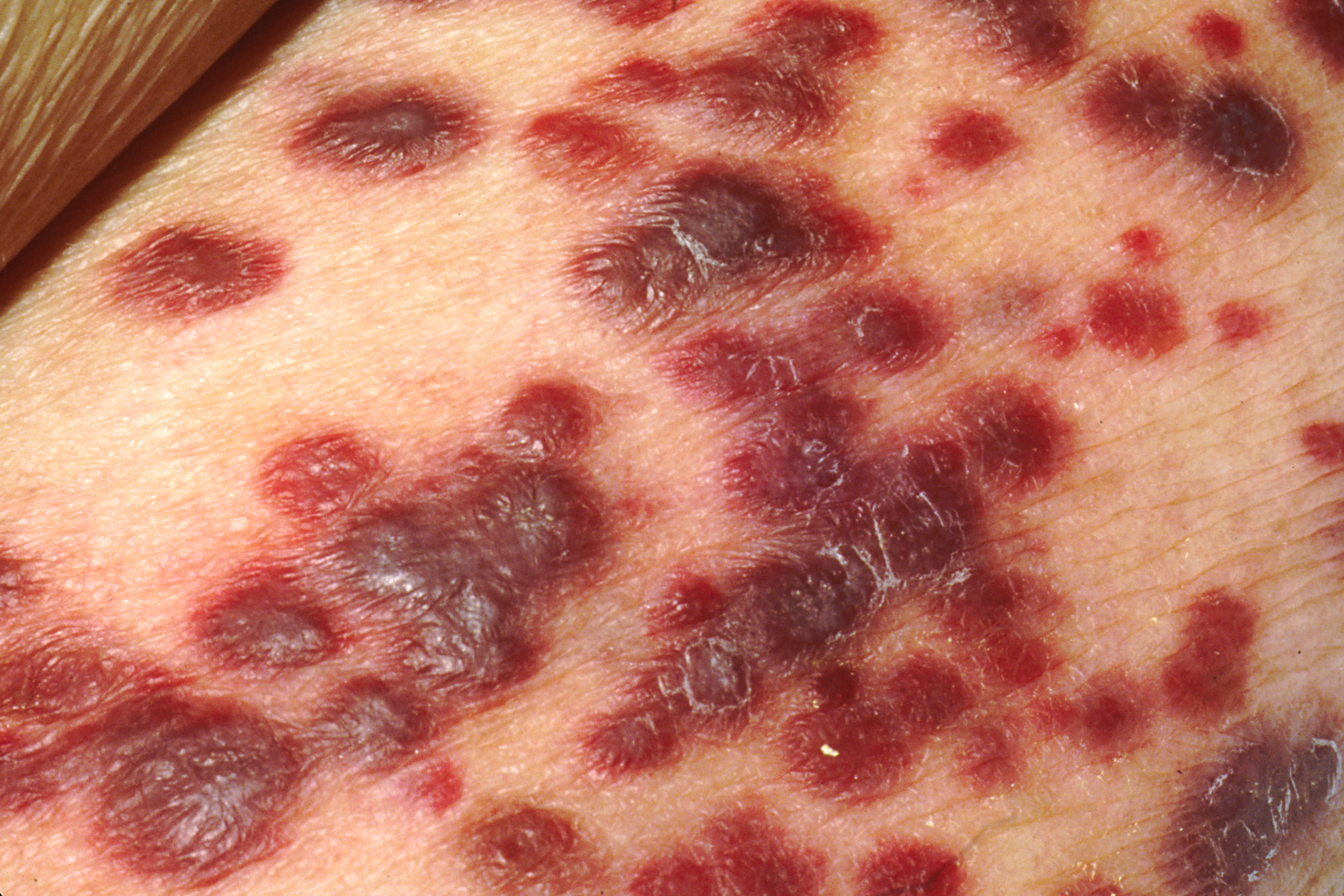
- Kaposi's sarcoma

Virus classification
- (unranked): Virus
- Realm: Duplodnaviria
- Kingdom: Heunggongvirae
- Phylum: Peploviricota
- Class: Herviviricetes
- Order: Herpesvirales
- Family: Orthoherpesviridae
- Genus: Rhadinovirus
- Species: Rhadinovirus humangamma8

Synonyms
- Human gammaherpesvirus 8; Human herpesvirus 8

= Kaposi's sarcoma-associated herpesvirus =

Species of virus

Kaposi's sarcoma-associated herpesvirus (KSHV) is the ninth known human herpesvirus. It is also called Human herpesvirus 8, or HHV-8 in short. This virus causes Kaposi's sarcoma, a cancer commonly occurring in AIDS patients, as well as primary effusion lymphoma, HHV-8-associated multicentric Castleman's disease and KSHV inflammatory cytokine syndrome. It is one of seven currently known human cancer viruses, or oncoviruses. Even after many years since the discovery of KSHV/HHV8, there is no known cure for KSHV associated tumorigenesis.

== History ==
In 1872, Moritz Kaposi described a blood vessel tumor (originally called "idiopathic multiple pigmented sarcoma of the skin") that has since been eponymously named Kaposi's sarcoma (KS). KS was at first thought to be an uncommon tumor of Jewish and Mediterranean populations until it was later determined to be extremely common throughout sub-Saharan African populations. This led to the first suggestions in the 1950s that this tumor might be caused by a virus. With the onset of the AIDS epidemic in the early 1980s, there was a sudden resurgence of KS affecting AIDS patients, with up to 50% of reported AIDS patients having this tumor—an extraordinary rate of cancer predisposition.

Careful analysis of epidemiologic data by Valerie Beral, Thomas Peterman and Harold Jaffe, led these investigators to propose that KS is caused by an unknown sexually transmitted virus that rarely causes tumors unless the host becomes immunosuppressed, as in AIDS.

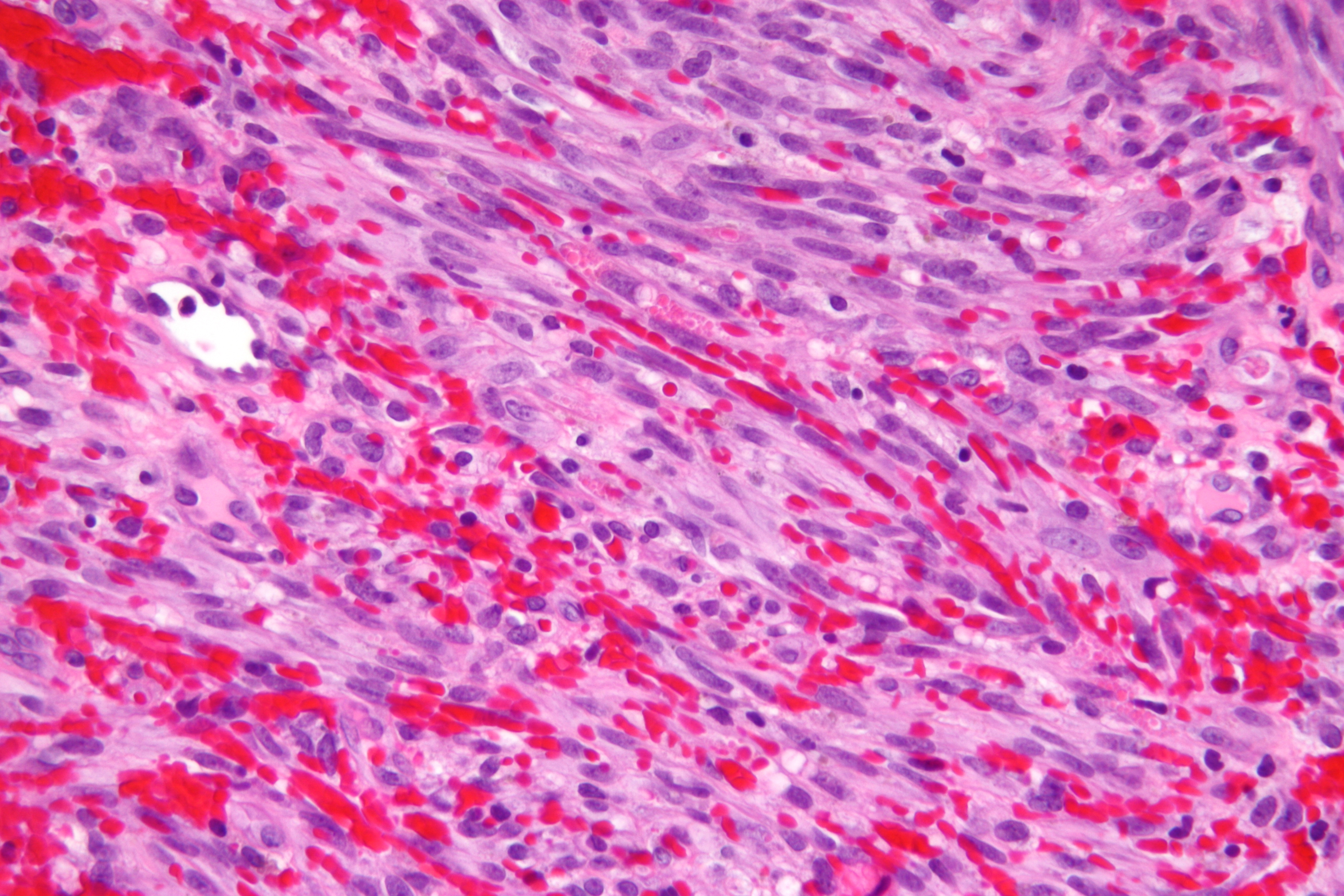
Micrograph of Kaposi sarcoma. H&E stain.

As early as 1984, scientists reported seeing herpesvirus-like structures in KS tumors examined under electron microscopy. Scientists had been searching for the agent causing KS, and over 20 agents were proposed as the possible cause, including cytomegalovirus and HIV itself. The pathogen was ultimately identified in 1994 by Yuan Chang and Patrick S. Moore, a wife and husband team at Columbia University, through the isolation of DNA fragments from a herpesvirus found in a KS tumor in an AIDS patient. Chang and Moore used representational difference analysis, or RDA, to find KSHV by comparing KS tumor tissue from an AIDS patient to his own unaffected tissue. The idea behind this experiment was that if a virus causes KS, the genomic DNA in the two samples should be precisely identical except for DNA belonging to the virus. In their initial RDA experiment, they isolated two small DNA fragments that represented less than 1% of the actual viral genome. These fragments were similar (but still distinct from) the known herpevirus sequences, indicating the presence of a new virus. Starting from these fragments, this research team was then able to sequence the entire genome of the virus less than two years later.

The discovery of this herpesvirus sparked considerable controversy and scientific in-fighting until sufficient data had been collected to show that indeed KSHV was the causative agent of Kaposi's sarcoma. The virus is now known to be a widespread infection of people living in sub-Saharan Africa; intermediate levels of infection occur in Mediterranean populations (including Lebanon, Saudi Arabia, Italy, and Greece) and low levels of infection occur in most Northern European and North American populations. The incidence rate is higher among gay and bisexual men.

== Virology ==
KSHV is a herpesvirus, and is a large double-stranded DNA virus with a protein covering that packages its nucleic acids, called the capsid, which is then surrounded by an amorphous protein layer called the tegument, and finally enclosed in a lipid envelope derived in part from the cell membrane. KSHV has a genome which is approximately 165,000 nucleic acid bases in length. The viral genome consists of a ~145 kilobase-long unique region, encoding all of expressed viral genes, which is flanked by ~20-30 kilobases of terminal repeat sequences. Each terminal repeat unit is 801 bp in length, has 85% G+C content and is oriented in a repetitive head-to-tail fashion. KSHV is a rhadinovirus, a Herpes genus remarkable since it has stolen numerous genes from host cells including, in the case of KSHV, genes that encode for complement-binding protein, IL-6, BCL-2, cyclin-D, a G protein-coupled receptor, interferon regulatory factor and Flice inhibitory protein (FLIP), as well as DNA synthesis proteins including dihydrofolate reductase, thymidine kinase, thymidylate synthetase, DNA polymerase and many others. While no other human tumor virus possesses these same genes, other tumor viruses target the same cellular pathways illustrating that at a basic level, all tumor viruses appear to attack the same cellular control pathways, so-called tumor suppressor pathways.

Crucial for the entry of KSHV into cells are the EPH receptor A2, Hrs, TSG101, and a few integrins (whose identity has yet to be confirmed). After infection, the virus enters into lymphocytes via macropinosomes. Once the virus newly infects a cell, the lipid membrane is shed and the virion travels to the nucleus. The viral genome is released where it circularizes into an episome through a poorly understood process that appears to involve homologous recombination of the terminal repeats. The viral episome is chromatinized upon entry into the host cell nucleus.

After entry, the virus typically remains in a latent ("quiet") state. Only a subset of genes that are encoded in the KSHV latency associated region (KLAR) are expressed during latency, including latency-associated nuclear antigen (LANA), vFLIP, vCyclin and 12 microRNAs. Latency is the hallmark of all KSHV-associated etiologies known to date including all KSHV-associated oncogenesis. It has been shown that both protein coding genes such as LANA and noncoding genes (microRNAs) encoded in KLAR are important for KSHV associated tumorigenesis. To study the functions of microRNAs, a detailed protocol of bacmid mutagenesis and a complete set of cell-lines carrying microRNA deletion mutants have been established and are available as a resource to researchers. Additionally, it has been shown that vFLIP and vCyclin interfere with the TGF-β signaling pathway indirectly by inducing the oncogenic host mir17-92 cluster. These observations represents a novel mechanism that may be important for KSHV tumorigenesis and angiogenesis, a hallmark of KS.

During latency, LANA is the only viral protein that is required for viral replication, which is carried out by the host replication machinery. LANA tethers the viral DNA to cellular chromosomes, inhibits p53 and retinoblastoma protein and suppresses viral genes needed for full virus production and assembly ("lytic replication"). Why only a subset of virus genes expressed during latency is not fully understood. But it has been shown that the latency associated gene expression can be explained in part by a characteristic epigenetic state that KSHV episome acquires during latency. LANA plays an important role during latency, regulating both host and virus transcripts and binding to multiple active promoters; it also associates with the host protein hSET1 that creates H3K4me3 marks in chromatin.

Various signals such as inflammation may provoke the virus to enter into lytic replication. The primary viral protein responsible for the switch between latent and lytic replication is known as the ORF50 Replication Transactivation Activator (RTA). When cell signaling conditions activate the generation of RTA, it in turn activates synthesis of a stereotypic cascade of secondary and tertiary viral proteins that ultimately make components of the virus capsid and also the DNA synthesis enzymes required to replicate the virus genome. During lytic replication, it is believed that the virus genome is replicated as a continuous linear molecule off of an episome (so-called rolling circle model). As each unit genome is replicated, it is cut within the terminal repeat region, and then packaged into a virus particle (virion). The virus then becomes enveloped with a lipid membrane as it transits the nucleus and the cytoplasm to exit the cell. Thus, whereas KSHV genome is circular in the nucleus of latently infected cells, it is packaged into infectious viruses as a linear molecule. When the virus enters into lytic replication, thousands of virus particles can be made from a single cell, which usually results in death of the infected cell.

=== COVID-19 and KSHV ===
It was discovered in 2020 that infection with the SARS-CoV-2 virus, the virus which causes COVID-19, may induce the lytic reactivation of KSHV in the human body, causing the herpes virus to cease latency and begin the formation of cancerous cells. Further, it was discovered that some medications used to treat infection with SARS-CoV-2, namely Nafamostat and Azithromycin, ended up promoting the production of mature virions, "... potentially inducing KSHV lytic reactivation."

== Pathophysiology ==
The mechanisms by which the virus is contracted are not well understood. Healthy individuals can be infected with the virus and show no signs or symptoms, due to the immune system's ability to keep the infection in check. Infection is of particular concern to the immunocompromised. Cancer patients receiving chemotherapy, AIDS patients, and organ transplant patients are all at a high risk of showing signs of infection..

Recent advances in sequencing technologies have uncovered that virus is chromatinized during latency. It has also been shown that virus encoded microRNA manipulates and interacts not only with host mRNA but also deregulate host long non-coding RNA (lncRNA). More recently, circularRNAs (circRNAs) are recently discovered in both EBV and KSHV

Infection with this virus is thought to be lifelong, but a healthy immune system will keep the virus in check. Many people infected with KSHV will never show any symptoms. Kaposi's sarcoma occurs when someone who has been infected with KSHV becomes immunocompromised due to AIDS, medical treatment, or, very rarely, aging.

KSHV is a known causative agent of four diseases:

- Kaposi's sarcoma – an angioproliferative tumor that can involve skin (most often), lymph nodes, or viscera,
- HHV-8-associated multicentric Castleman's disease – a lymphoproliferative disorder,
- Primary effusion lymphoma – KSHV-associated aggressive lymphoma involving B-cells that are immature plasma cells termed plasmablasts and regarded as one type of lymphoid neoplasms with plasmablastic differentiation,
- KSHV inflammatory cytokine syndrome – a syndrome with MCD-like symptoms but without associated pathology.

== Epidemiology ==
In the 1970s, the global prevalence rate for HHV-8 was 2 to 10%. The seroprevalence of HHV-8 varies significantly geographically and infection rates in northern European, southeast Asian, and Caribbean countries are between 2–4%, in Mediterranean countries at approximately 10%, and in sub-Saharan African countries at approximately 40%. In South America, infection rates are low in general but are high among Amerindians. Even within individual countries, significant variation can be observed across different regions, with infection rates of about 19.2% in Xinjiang compared to about 9.5% in Hubei, China. Although seroprevalence has been consistently shown to increase with age in a linear manner, countries with high infection rates may see higher seroprevalence in younger age groups. Educational level has shown an inverse correlation with infection rates. Individuals infected with HIV-1 or genital warts are generally more likely to be co-infected with HHV-8.

In countries with low seroprevalence, HHV-8 is primarily limited to AIDS and KS patients. In countries with high seroprevalence, infection is frequent in childhood, indicating a likely mother-to-child transmission by saliva. In a Zambian survey, all children with KS had mothers who were positive for HHV-8, whereas not all children whose mothers had KS were HHV-8 positive. In another Zambian survey, 13.8% of children were seropositive for HHV-8 by age 4. Seroprevalence has not been shown to vary significantly because of gender or marital status.

== Evolution ==
The most recent common ancestor of this virus in the Mediterranean, Iran, and Xinjiang, China, has been estimated to have evolved 29,872 years (95% highest probability density 26,851–32,760 years) ago. the most recent common ancestor for viruses isolated in Xinjiang was 2037 years (95% highest probability density 1843–2229 years) ago. Given the historical links between the Mediterranean and Xinjiang during the Roman period it seems likely that this virus was introduced to Xinjiang along the Silk Road. The mutation rate was estimated to be 3.44×10^{−6} substitutions per site per year (95% highest probability density 2.2×10^{−6} to 4.71×10^{−6}). However, the global distribution of different genotypes of KSHV and the potential transmission path need further studies.

Typing of isolates is based on the variable K1 membrane protein. Six types are recognised (A–F).

== Prevention ==
Since persons infected with KSHV will asymptomatically give the virus, caution should be used by sex partners in having unprotected sex and activities where saliva might be shared during sexual activity. Prudent advice is to use condoms when needed and avoid deep kissing with partners who may have KSHV infections.

== Treatment ==
Kaposi's sarcoma is usually a localized tumor that can be treated either surgically or through local irradiation. Chemotherapy with drugs such as liposomal anthracyclines or paclitaxel may be used, particularly for invasive disease. Antiviral drugs, such as ganciclovir, that target the replication of herpesviruses such as KSHV have been used to successfully prevent development of Kaposi's sarcoma, although once the tumor develops these drugs are of little or no use. For patients with AIDS-KS, the most effective therapy is highly active antiretroviral therapy to reduce HIV infection. AIDS patients receiving adequate anti-HIV treatment may have up to a 90% reduction in Kaposi's sarcoma occurrence.

Although KSHV affects the host immune system, there is ample chance for clinical intervention to recover this change. One challenge is overexpression inhibitory of target cell repress immune. Under longtime inflammation stimulation, the target cell becomes unable to respond, which leads to an exhausted phenotype. The activation immunotherapies can revive and enhance immune cell function. Comparing to other immunotherapies, therapies targeting the anti-programmed cell death protein 1 (PD-1)/programmed death-ligand 1 (PD-L1) has been a great success. Because of KSHV infection, the monocytes increase the expression of PD-1, which is an inhibitory molecule, and cause immune escape in many tumor types. There is high PD-1 expression in NK cells from KS-HIV patients and cause exhausted phenotype. The anti-PD-1 antibody, (nivolumab or pembrolizumab), demonstrated a significant antitumor effect. Nivolumab is currently an ongoing phase I clinical trial, and Pembrolizumab has shown its function in treatment for HIV and KS patients in phase I and is in a phase II trial for treatment. A thalidomide analog medicine – Pomalidomide was also granted by the FDA in 2011. Pomalidomide was shown to recover the expression of MHC-1, which help cell display intracellular proteins to cytotoxic T cells, and it also can repress the expression of PD-L1 and increase the CD8+ T cell killing.

== Genome ==
The first KSHV genome was sequenced in 1996 and consists of ~140 kb of DNA. KSHV encodes for ~90 proteins and multiple non-coding RNAs, such as microRNAs. The "ORF" genes are named based on genome position of the homologous genes in the first rhadinovirus described, herpesvirus saimiri (HVS). The "K" genes are unique to KSHV, Some KSHV genes have well-characterized functions, while others remain uncharacterized.

An unusually large number of KSHV genes has been pirated from cellular (host) DNA (see list below).

ORF2 – dihydrofolate reductase

ORF8 – gB – envelope glycoprotein involved in viral entry

ORF9 – Pol8 – DNA polymerase required for viral DNA replication

ORF10 – regulates RNA export and responses to type I IFNs

ORF13 — vFLIP, an apoptosis inhibitor

ORF16 – vBcl2 (also v-bcl2)

ORF18, ORF24, ORF30, ORF31, ORF34, ORF66 – viral transcription factors required for the expression of late genes

ORF21 – vTK – thymidine kinase

ORF22 – gH – envelope glycoprotein involved in viral entry

ORF23 – uncharacterized

ORF25, ORF26 and ORF65 – capsid proteins

ORF33 – involved in viral particle formation

ORF34 – unclear function

ORF35 – unclear function, mutant does not express early viral genes

ORF36 – vPK – viral protein kinase with multiple roles in replication cycle

ORF37 – SOX – dual function protein – DNase activity required for genome packaging and RNase activity regulates host gene expression

ORF38 – involved in viral particle formation

ORF39 – gM – envelope glycoprotein

ORF40 and ORF41 – helicase and primase – DNA replication

ORF42 – uncharacterized

ORF45 – tegument protein, binds and prevents dephosphorylation of p90 ribosomal S6 kinases (RSKs) and ERK for modulate the ERK/RSK MAPK signaling pathway

ORF47 – gL – envelope glycoprotein involved in viral entry

ORF49 – may be required for viral gene expression

ORF50 – RTA, replication and transcription activator – the major transcription factor driving lytic KSHV reactivation

ORF52 – KicGAS – tegument protein required for formation of virions and inhibition of cGAS DNA sensing

ORF53 – gN – envelope glycoprotein

ORF55 – uncharacterized

ORF57 – MTA – regulates RNA stability, export and translation of viral genes

ORF59 – PF–8 – polymerase processivity factor, accessory subunit of viral DNA polymerase

ORF67 and ORF69 – nuclear egress

ORF70 – thymidylate synthase

ORF72 – vCyclin

ORF73 – LANA (or LNA), latency-associated nuclear antigen– tethers genome to chromosome during latency, also regulates host gene expression. A cytoplasmic form of LANA may inhibit activation of immune responses.

ORF74 – vGPCR

ORF75 – FGARAT

PAN, polyadenylated nuclear RNA – non–coding linear and circular RNAs

miRNAs (mirKs) – viral microRNAs expressed during latency to regulate proliferation and cell death

K1 – involved in oncogenesis

K2 – Interleukin 6 homolog, Q2HRC7 (also called v-IL6)

K3 and K5 – ubiquitin E3 ligases – regulates antigen presentation

K4 – vCCL2 – chemokine (also called v-MIPI)

K4.1 – vCCL3 – chemokine

K6 — v-MIPII

K8 – transcriptional repressor – modulates chromatin

K8.1 – envelope glycoprotein

K9 – vIRF1, viral interferon regulatory factor 1

K10 – vIRF4. A circular RNA (circRNA) is also generated from this locus.

K10.5 – vIRF3 (initially designated LANA2), is expressed during latency in PEL cell lines, but is also a bona fide lytic factor, like all of the vIRFs.

K11 – vIRF2

K12 – kaposin

K13 – vFLIP

K14 — v-NCAM

== See also ==
- Oncovirus (cancer virus)
- Smoker's paradox
