= Cancer of unknown primary origin =

- Other names: Occult cancer
- Specialty: Oncology

Cancer of unknown primary origin (CUP) is a cancer that is determined to be at the metastatic stage at the time of diagnosis, but a primary tumor cannot be identified. A diagnosis of CUP requires a clinical picture consistent with metastatic disease and one or more biopsy results inconsistent with a tumor cancer.

CUP is found in about 3 to 5% of all people diagnosed with invasive cancer, and carries a poor prognosis in most (80 to 85%) of those circumstances. The other 15 to 20% of people, however, have localized or small metastatic sites at the time of diagnosis, and is associated with a relatively long survival with appropriate treatment.

The worldwide incidence of CUP is estimated to be 2–15 cases per 100,000 person years and this incidence is declining as advances are made in diagnostic imaging, molecular markers and other cancer diagnostic tests such that it is easier to find a primary tumor. Risk factors for CUP are similar to other types of cancers and include tobacco use, alcohol misuse, a family history of cancer, and diabetes.

Treatment usually involves empirical chemotherapy (most often with a platinum agent with paclitaxel or gemcitabine) but clinical data does not support the superiority of one drug or class over others.

== Signs and symptoms ==
Most cancers typically present as a single primary tumor. Over the course of time—particularly if the primary tumor is left untreated—smaller "satellite" tumors will appear at other places in the body, a phenomenon known as metastasis. Less commonly, a metastatic tumor is found first; but in most such cases, the primary tumor can then be located via examination and testing. Rarely (1–3% of the time), the primary tumor cannot be found because it is too small, or because it has regressed due to immune system activity or other factors. In such situations a diagnosis of cancer of unknown primary origin (CUP) is made.

CUP usually comes to attention because of masses or swellings found somewhere in the body, either by physical examination or on medical imaging performed for another indication. The disease typically develops rapidly, and metastases may occur in places in the body that are otherwise unusual. Comprehensive physical examination is part of the process to identify a possible primary source of cancer; this should include the breasts, lymph nodes, the skin, external genitals, as well as an internal examination of the rectum and of the pelvic organs.

The location of metastases may be a clue as to the underlying source, even if this cannot be found on investigations. For instance, a woman in whom there is axillary lymphadenopathy (swelling in the lymph nodes of the armpit) it is likely that the cancer originated in the breast, and men with lymph node deposits in the mediastinum of the chest and/or retroperitoneal space of the abdomen may have a germ cell tumor.

== Mechanism ==
Cancer of unknown primary source is not a single type of cancer, although researchers have attempted to find a common characteristic that explains why a cancer might spread very early without causing symptoms at the site of origin. It is generally accepted that cancer of unknown primary site exists because the primary tumor is not identified due to clinical or technological inefficiencies, or because the primary tumor regresses or stays dormant after spreading the cancer cells that generate the metastases. This view is widely accepted in oncology; in fact, these cancers are also referred to as occult primary tumors. Because the site of the primary tumor usually dictates the treatment and expected outcome, this view may help create uncertainty and anxiety among health professionals and patients, who may feel that their evaluation has been incomplete.

Because stem cells have a natural ability to migrate and also play a key role in cancer development, it has been proposed that a cancer of unknown primary site may form when deregulated, premalignant or cancerous stem cells migrate away from their natural tissue and give rise to a cancer in the new site before or without generating a tumor in their original tissue. Forming a tumor in a tissue is not a prerequisite for stem cells to move away from that tissue. Stem cells can migrate from their natural tissue and initiate a cancer in the new site before generating a detectable tumor in their natural tissue. In this case, the primary tumor could be identified after some time. However, stem cells can also migrate away from their natural tissue without generating a cancer there. In this case, the "primary tumor" would never exist (see Figure). This can explain why the primary site is not identified even on postmortem examination in many patients with these cancers. This view of CUP may provide relief to health professionals and patients. After a detailed imaging and pathologic analysis, oncologists can tell their patients with CUP that metastasis does not always involve the formation of a primary tumor, and that their diagnostic evaluation is complete.

== Diagnosis ==
In recent years, microscopic and other diagnostic techniques have improved dramatically. However, the tissue of origin can be still determined only about in one in four cases of CUPs with these methods. In some cases, the part of the body where cancer cells are first discovered helps the doctor decide which diagnostic tests will be most helpful. Additional clues which may be helpful in determining the primary site include the pattern of spread, and the cell type, which is based on its appearance under a microscope (histology).

The initial work-up of a cancer of unknown primary includes a CT scan of the chest, abdomen, and pelvis, with IV contrast. Women with enlarged lymph nodes (lymphadenopathy) confined to the axillary region with CUP should have a mammogram or ultrasound to evaluate for possible breast cancer. If those imaging studies are normal, then an MRI of the breast may be appropriate. A PET CT scan should be done for squamous cell carcinoma involving lymph nodes of the neck region. For other types of cancer of unknown primary, a PET-CT offers uncertain benefit.

The pattern of spread may suggest the location of the primary site. For example, metastatic cancer found in the upper body is more likely to have an origin above the diaphragm, at sites such as the lung and breast. If the metastatic cancer appears first in the lower part of the body, the primary cancer is more likely to be at sites below the diaphragm, such as the pancreas and liver.

When the cancer cells are poorly differentiated (that is, they look less evolved than normal cells when viewed under a microscope), the cancer may be either a lymphoma or a germ cell tumor. Lymphomas begin in the lymphatic system. Germ cell tumors usually begin in the ovaries and testes. In patients in whom the primary cancer is eventually found, the lung and pancreas are the most common primary cancer sites. CUP also may be traced to the breast, prostate, colon, or rectum as the primary site.

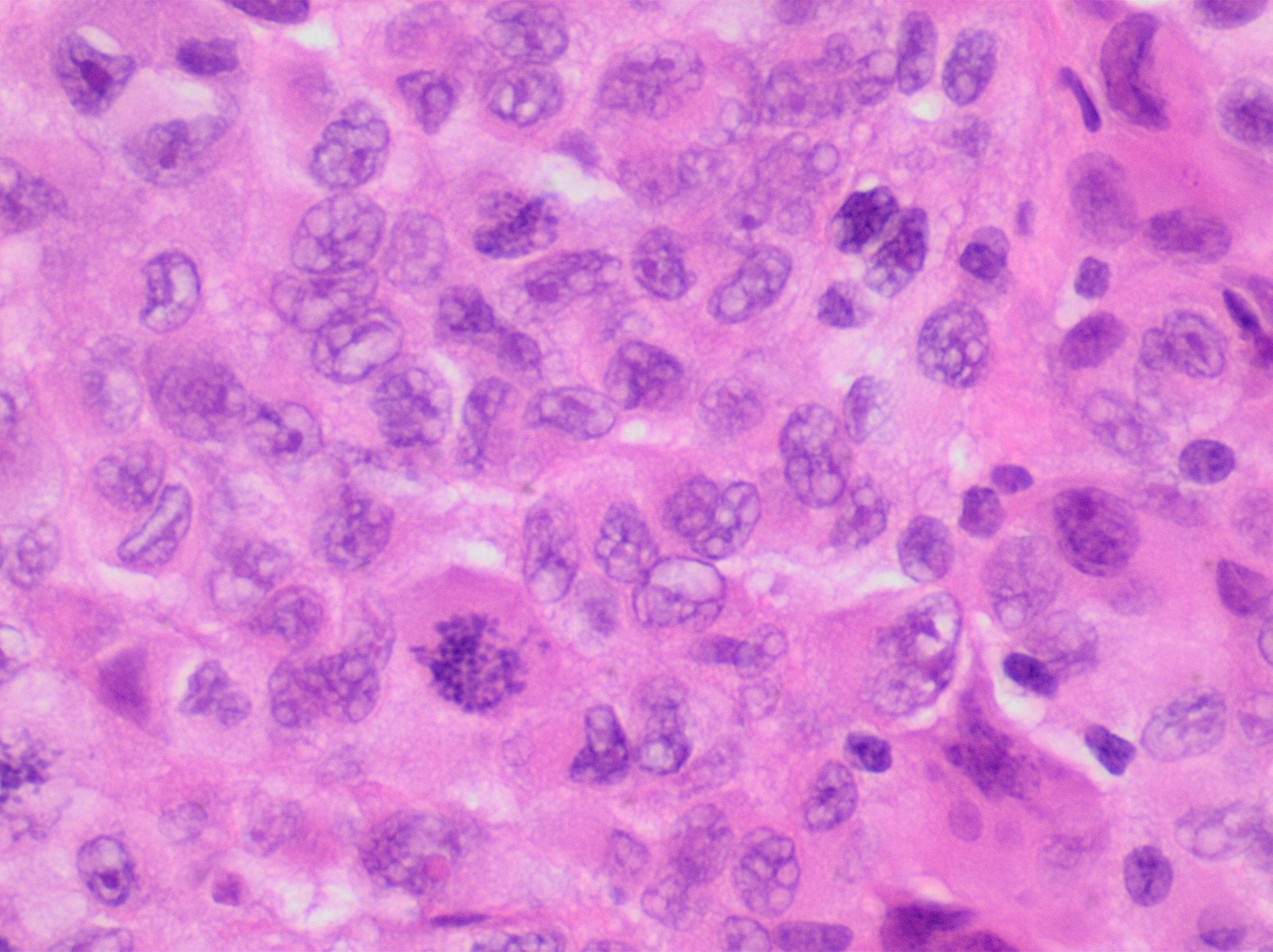
Histopathology of a biopsy of a lymph node with cancer of unknown primary origin, showing high-grade tumor cells, which are undifferentiated, that is, the primary tumor cannot be determined by their histologic appearance

Sometimes, however, even when doctors use very sophisticated methods to try to identify the primary site, the part of the body the cancer cells came from cannot be determined. About 2 to 4 percent of all cancer patients have a cancer whose primary site is never found. Identifying the primary tumor site is important because knowing its location and type often helps doctors plan the best treatment. Treatment that is specific to the suspected type of cancer is likely to be more effective. Still, when diagnostic tests have not identified the primary site, doctors must decide whether the potential benefits of more extensive testing outweigh a patient's discomfort, possible complications, and the financial costs.

=== Immunohistochemical testing ===
Immunohistochemistry including cytokeratin 7 and cytokeratin 20 can give a clue about possible origins of carcinomas of unknown primary site.

Antibodies may be used to determine the expression of protein markers on the surface of cancer cells. Often the expression of these antigens is similar to the tissue that the cancer grew from, so immunohistochemical testing sometimes helps to identify the source of the cancer. Individual tests often do not provide definitive answers, but sometimes patterns may be observed, suggesting a particular site of origin (e.g. lung, colon, etc.). Immunohistochemical testing suggests a single source of cancer origin in about one in four cases of CUP. However, there is a lack of definitive research data showing that treatment guided by information from immunohistochemical testing improves outcomes or long-term prognosis.

=== Classification ===
CUP may be classified by its appearance under a light microscope. The majority of cancers of unknown primary, about 90%, are adenocarcinomas, with 60% appearing as moderately to well-differentiated adenocarcinoma, while about 30% are poorly differentiated adenocarcinoma. The term adenocarcinoma refers to cancer that begins in the cells in glandular structures in the lining or covering of certain organs in the body. Common primary sites for adenocarcinomas include the lung, pancreas, breast, prostate, stomach, liver, and colon.

The remaining 10 percent are either poorly or undifferentiated malignant neoplasms (5%), or squamous cell carcinomas (5%). Rarely, CUP may appear as neuroendocrine tumors, or mixed tumors, such as sarcomatoid, basaloid, or adenosquamous carcinomas.

=== Molecular and genomic profiling ===
Molecular profiling using next-generation sequencing (NGS) has emerged as an important complementary tool in the diagnostic evaluation of cancer of unknown primary. Targeted multigene panels can identify potentially actionable genomic alterations in approximately one third of CUP cases; however, their ability to reliably determine tissue of origin remains limited.

== Management ==
Because CUP refers to many different cancers, treatment depends on where the cancer is found, the microscopic appearance of the cancer cells, the biochemical characterization of the cells, and the patient's age and overall physical condition. In women, who present with axillary lymph node involvement, treatment is offered along the lines of breast cancer. In patients, who have neck lymph node involvement, then treatment is offered along the lines of head and neck cancer. If inguinal lymph nodes are involved, then treatment may be offered along the lines of genitourinary cancer.

If the site of origin is unknown or undiscovered, then the histology of the tumor (e.g., adenocarcinoma, squamous cell or mesenchymal) can usually be identified, and a probable origin may be assumed. When this is possible, then treatment is based on the type of cell and probable origin. Based on histological subtype, combination chemotherapy may be selected. A combination of carboplatin and paclitaxel is often used. Advanced techniques such as FISH and tissue of origin testing may also be employed. Germ cell tumors often carry abnormality of chromosome 12, which if identified, directs treatment for metastatic germ cell tumors.

No method is standard for all forms of CUP, but chemotherapy, radiation therapy, hormone therapy, and surgery may be used alone or in combination to treat patients who have CUP. Even when the cancer is unlikely to be cured, treatment may help the patient live longer or improve the patient's quality of life. Radiation may be used to shrink a variety of local tumors. However, the potential side effects of the treatment must be considered along with the potential benefits. In CUP to secondary neck nodes, surgery followed by external beam radiotherapy is sufficient. For CUP with an unfavorable prognosis, treatment with taxanes may provide a slight survival benefit. The uncertainties and ambiguity inherent in a CUP diagnosis may cause additional stress for the patient.

Comprehensive genomic profiling has expanded therapeutic opportunities in cancer of unknown primary by identifying actionable genomic alterations, mutational signatures, and biomarkers predictive of response to targeted therapies or immunotherapy. Integration of WGTS has been shown to increase the proportion of patients with CUP eligible for standard-of-care targeted treatments or clinical trial enrollment compared with targeted gene panels alone.

== Research directions ==
Current research in cancer of unknown primary focuses on integrating comprehensive genomic and transcriptomic sequencing with machine learning–based tissue-of-origin prediction models. These approaches aim to improve diagnostic accuracy and guide personalized treatment strategies.

Prospective clinical validation studies are ongoing to determine the impact of WGTS-based diagnostic and therapeutic stratification on patient outcomes and to define its role in routine oncology practice.

== Prognosis ==
Most people with cancer of unknown primary origin have widely disseminated and incurable disease, although a few can be cured through treatment. With treatment, typical survival with CUP ranges from 6 to 16 months. Survival rates are lower in cases with visceral metastatic disease, ranging from 6 to 9 months. Survival rates are higher when the cancer is more limited to lymph nodes, pleura, or peritoneal metastasis, which ranges from 14 to 16 months. Long-term prognosis is somewhat better if a particular source of cancer is strongly suggested by clinical evidence.

== Epidemiology ==
CUP sometimes runs in families. It has been associated with familial lung, kidney, and colorectal cancers, which suggests that these sites may often be the origin of unidentifiable CUP cancers.

=== UK ===
Around 9,800 people were diagnosed with cancer of unknown primary in the UK in 2011, and around 10,625 people died from the disease in 2012.

== History ==
From 1980 to 1990, definition of unknown primary cancer was based on imaging results. Subsequently, research on immunohistochemistry allowed for the classification of cancer of unknown primary into sub-types. From 2000 to 2010, tailored therapies began to evolve, targeting specific subtypes of unknown primary.
