= Follicular dendritic cell sarcoma =

Dendritic cell sarcoma cancer that effects the follicular dendritic cells

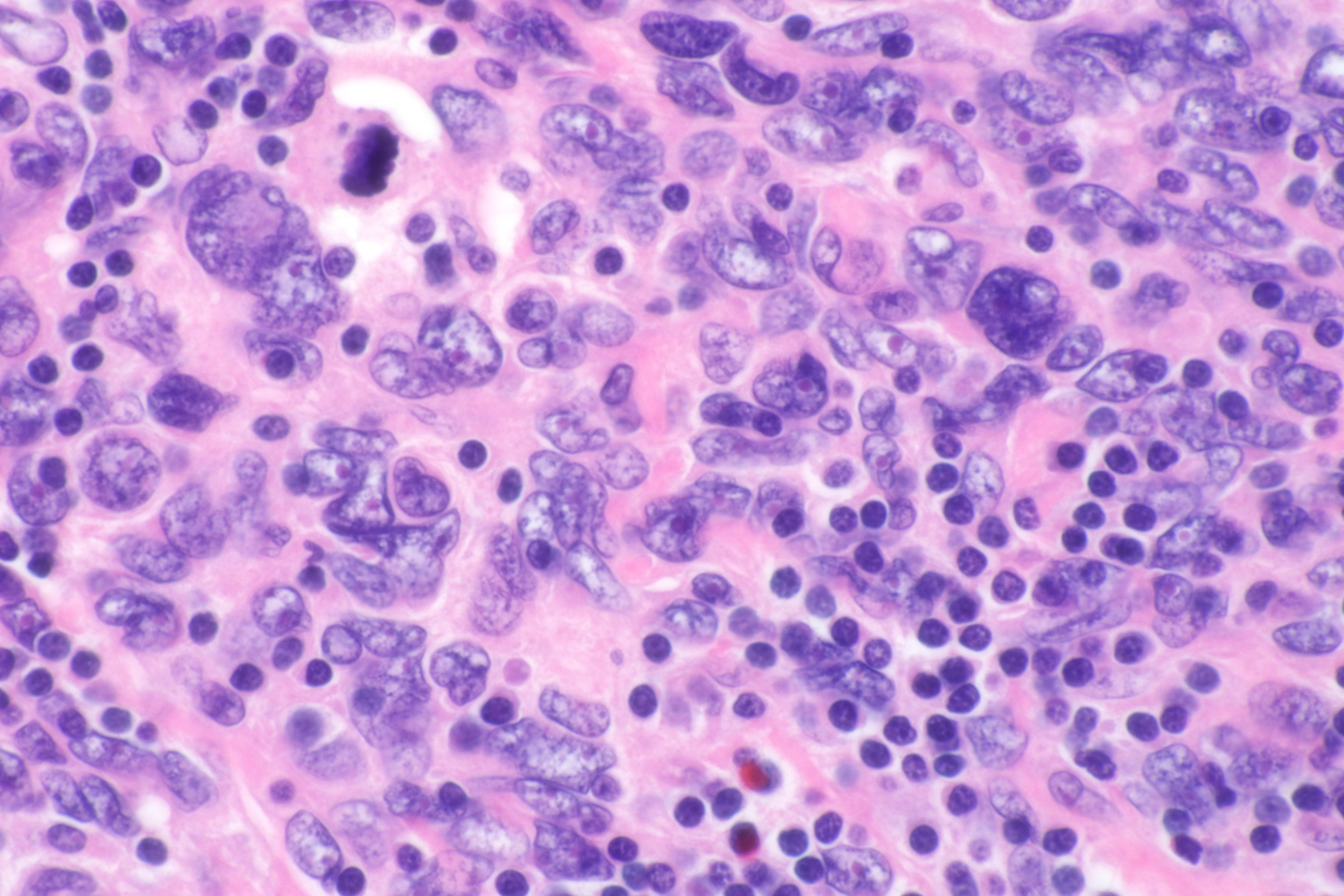
- Micrograph showing a follicular dendritic cell sarcoma. The cancer cells are larger and have pale staining nuclei. The smaller (benign) interspersed lymphocytes (darker blue) are common and suggest the diagnosis. H&E stain.
- Specialty: Oncology

Follicular dendritic cell sarcoma tumor
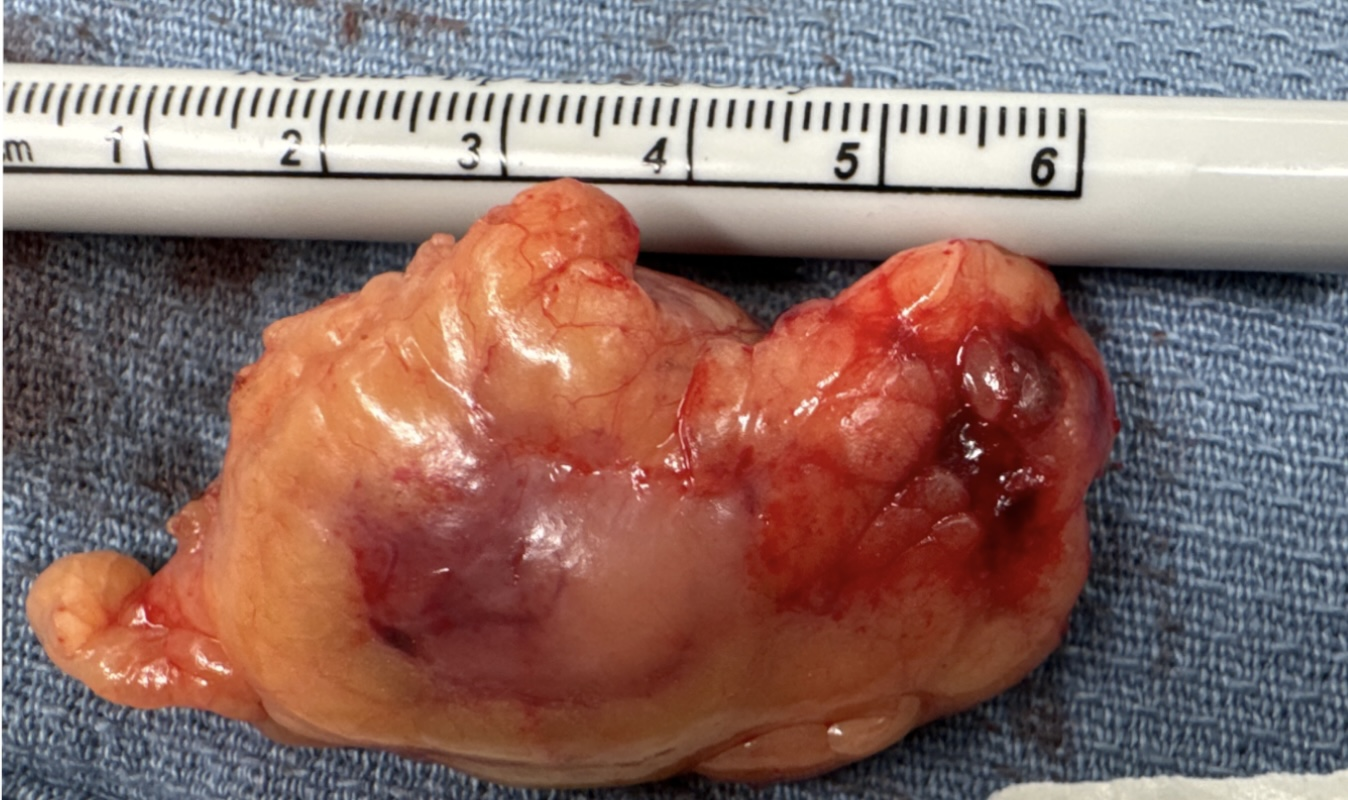
- Follicular dendritic cell sarcoma tumor removed from the omentum.
- Specialty: Oncology

Follicular dendritic cell sarcoma (FDCS) is an extremely rare neoplasm. While the existence of FDC tumors was predicted by Lennert in 1978, the tumor wasn't fully recognized as its own cancer until 1986 after characterization by Monda et al. It accounts for only 0.4% of soft tissue sarcomas, but has significant recurrent and metastatic potential is considered an intermediate grade malignancy. The major hurdle in treating FDCS has been misdiagnosis. It is a newly characterized cancer, and because of its similarities in presentation and markers to lymphoma, both Hodgkin and Non-Hodgkin subtypes, diagnosis of FDCS can be difficult. With recent advancements in cancer biology better diagnostic assays and chemotherapeutic agents have been made to more accurately diagnose and treat FDCS.

== Signs and symptoms ==
Follicular dendritic cells are localized in germinal centers of lymphoid follicles and have an integral role in regulation of the germinal center reaction and present antigens to B cells. Most cases of FDCS develop in the lymph nodes, but about 30% develop in extranodal sites. In 1998 the largest study on the disease was a retrospective review with fifty-one patients. Of these fifty-one patients, no conclusive pattern was found in regard to age, sex, race or presentation. The median patient age was 41 (range 14–76), and while most cases presented with cervical and axillary lymphadenopathy, 17 presented in extranodal sites including the liver, spleen, bowel and pancreas. With such a range of patient histories no definitive cause has been linked to FDCS. There has, however, been some evidence that previous exposure to the Epstein–Barr virus (EBV) or diagnosis of Castleman's disease can increase the risk of developing FDCS—medical literature in 2000 reported approximately 12% of all cases of FDC tumors are associated with EBV, with variance in different organs, but the role of EBV remains unclear in FDC tumor pathogenesis; and EBV does not appear to play a role in the transformation process of Castleman's disease to FDC sarcoma because all cases the report found associated with Castleman's disease were EBV negative.

Symptoms of FDCS vary, and are largely dependent on the part of the body in which the tumor develops. The most common symptom is painless swelling in lymph nodes. This symptom alone, however, is nonconclusive, as it is associated with many other diseases, including the common cold. Other symptoms include cough, sore throat, difficulty swallowing, weight loss and tiredness. In cases that present in extranodal sites outside of the head and neck region, organ specific symptoms are observed.

== Diagnosis ==
=== Staining ===
Proliferation of FDC cells is characteristic of many neoplastic conditions including follicular hyperplasia, follicular lymphoma, nodular lymphocyte predominate Hodgkin's disease and angioimmunoblastic T-cell lymphoma. Despite finally being recognized as its own disease in 1986, diagnosis of FDCS is still difficult. FDC cells are large, contain two nuclei, and form clusters with lymphocytes making them difficult to distinguish in staining. These cells are best visualized with immunostaining using the FDC markers CD21, CD35, R4/23, clusterin, and KiM4p. Marker analysis has also led to debate over the origin of the cell type; it coexpresses CD45, a leukocyte common antigen, and CD15, a monocyte common antigen. Because of the debate and difficulty of staining, pathologic diagnosis often requires morphologic, cytochemical and electron microscope analysis as well.

=== Cellular mutations ===
Cellular abnormalities found within the FDCS tumor have been exploited for diagnostic purposes. Characteristically, FDCS have mircotubuloreticular structures (MTRS) and increased levels of intracellular clusterin. MTRS contribute to microtubule formation of many structures, including the mitotic spindle, during cell division. This contributes to many of the hallmarks of cancer, including proliferative signaling, growth activation, and replicative immortality. Clusterin is a heterodimeric protein that aids in the clearance of cellular debris and is involved with apoptosis. Clusterin can be stained to help distinguish FDCS and is involved in the many important cancer hallmarks, including resistance to cell death and evading growth suppressors.

== Treatment ==
=== CHOP ===
At the time of the follicular dendritic cell sarcoma discovery, information on the effect of chemotherapy and radiation on it was nonexistent. The best physicians could do was try existing chemotherapeutic agents. With no evidence of the clinical benefit of chemotherapy, many of the first cases were treated solely with complete resection and/or radiation. However, 12 of 31 patients who had surgery alone as primary treatment relapsed. Of the patients who received surgery and radiation, 2 of 8 relapsed. It became apparent that better treatment options were necessary. Being so similar to lymphomas, physicians began using a common leukemia and non-Hodgkin's lymphoma chemotherapy regimen on FDCS patients: CHOP.

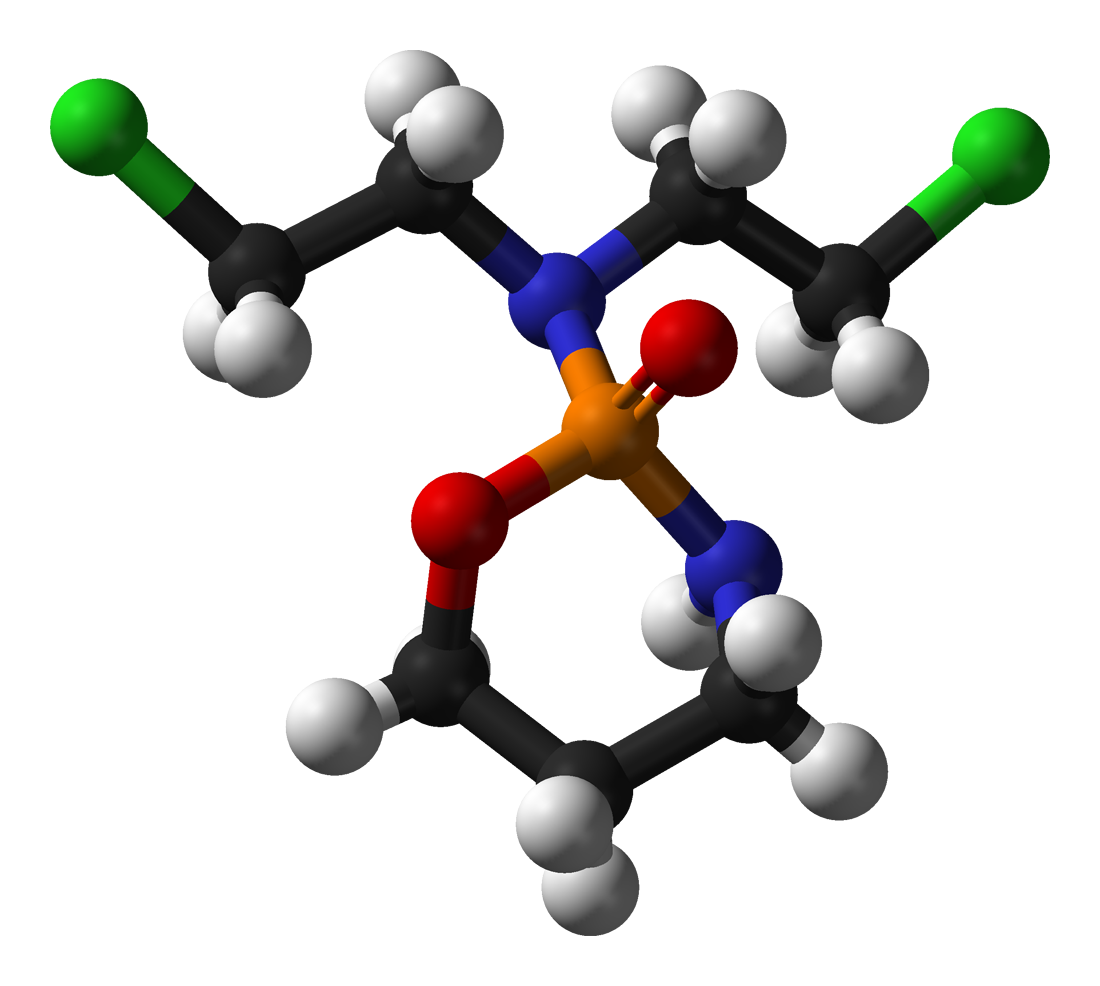
Chemical structure of cyclophosphamide

The CHOP regimen consists of Cyclophosphamide, Doxorubicin, Oncovin, and Prednisone (CHOP). They all exploit different pathways common in cancer cells. Cyclophosphamide slows or stops cell growth. It targets cells that are rapidly dividing, which include cancer cells that are self-sufficient in growth signals and insensitive to antigrowth signals. More importantly, the biological actions of cyclophosphamide are dose-dependent. At high doses it is very cytotoxic; its metabolite phosphoramide adds an alkyl group to the N7 position on guanine resulting in arrested growth and cell death. The metabolite is only formed in cells with low levels of cytoplasmic aldehyde dehydrogenase (ALDH), resulting in relatively low chemotherapeutic toxicity in other non-cancer cells like bone marrow. It is also an immunosuppressant and decreases the inflammatory response. At low doses, while it is less cytotoxic, it shows some anti-angiogenic properties. The mechanism is not fully understood; it is thought that it interferes with the VEGF growth factors produced in and around the tumor microenvironment.

Doxorubicin interferes with cell growth and replication by intercalating in DNA. This stops topoisomerase II from relaxing the DNA strands and inhibits transcription. Recent studies have also shown that doxorubicin may be involved in the PI3K/AKT/mTOR pathway. An important hallmark of cancer, Akt is part of the cell survival pathways by inhibiting apoptosis. There is also evidence that Akt is involved in angiogenesis and vascular maturation. Activation of the PI3K/AKT/mTOR pathway mediates VEGF production in cells. Therefore, doxorubicin has a dual role in cancer treatment: it inhibits cell survival (causes apoptosis), and decreases angiogenesis.

Oncovin, more commonly known as vincristine, is a mitotic inhibitor. It binds to tubulin dimers, inhibiting the assembly of microtubule structures like the cytoskeleton and mitotic spindle. Although this drug still cannot strictly target cancer cells, cancer cells have a higher average turnover of microtubules making them more susceptible to the cytotoxicity of oncovin. Prednisone, the last drug in the CHOP combination therapy is a corticosteroid that acts as an immunosuppressant.

Although some results were seen in FDCS patients treated with CHOP, they were far from consistent. Using a chemotherapy regimen designed for another cancer is an archaic "guess-and-check" way of treating a disease. In 2008 the largest review of FDCS was published as a retrospective analysis on 98 patients and the authors recommended that surgery with no adjuvant treatment be the standard for FDCS treatment. Patients treated with surgery alone had a recurrence rate of 40% and those treated with adjuvant therapy after surgery did not have a significantly different recurrence rate. Radiation and/or chemotherapy had no significant effect in improving patients' disease-free survival. With developments in our understanding of the hallmarks of cancer, however, novel approaches to specifically targeting and treating FDCS are being developed.

=== (PEG)-liposomal doxorubicin ===
One such development is in the delivery of doxorubicin. While it is an effective inducer of apoptosis, doxorubicin is quickly filtered out of the body. By loading a PEG-liposome with doxorubicin the circulation time and localization to tumors greatly increases. Cancerous tumors characteristically have extensive angiogenesis and leaky vasculatures, which causes the PEG-liposomes to naturally accumulate in the tumor. This also allows for patients to receive lower and fewer doses of the drug and experience fewer side effects.

=== Taxotere and gemcitabine ===
Chemical structure of Gemcitabine

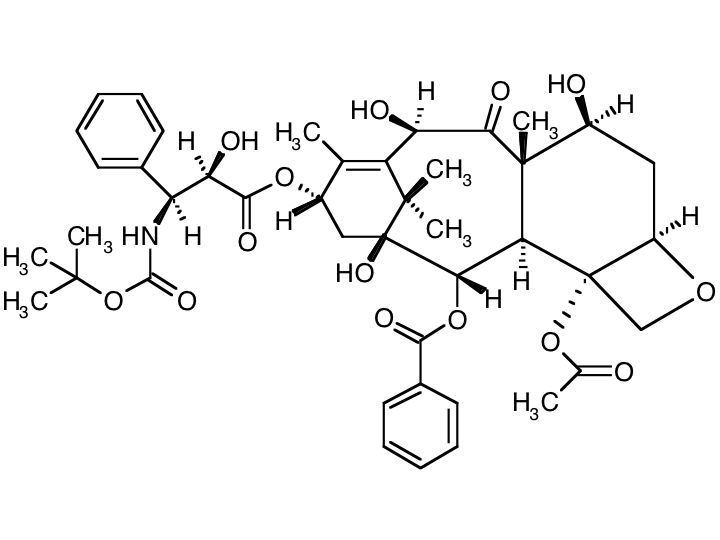
Chemical structure of Taxotere

Newer cases are also starting to be treated by taxotere and gemcitabine. Taxotere is similar to Oncovin used in CHOP; it irreversibly binds beta tubulin halting formation of microtubules. Taxotere has an added benefit though; it also phosphorylates bcl-2 to halt the anti-apoptotic pathway. The dual effect of taxotere on integral cancer pathways makes it a more potent drug than Oncovin. Gemcitabene is a nucleoside analog and when incorporated into DNA during replication leads to apoptosis; the fluorine on the 2’ carbon atom stops other nucleosides from attaching. The most important part of this combination therapy, however, is the synergism between the drugs. While researchers are not entirely sure of the mechanism, there is evidence of synergistic effects of taxotere and gemcitabine when used in combination. This allows for decreased dosages of each single agent with an increased apoptotic response.

== Research ==
All advances in the understanding and treatment of FDCS come from advances made in other cancers. Funding for research is hard to come by and being such a rare cancer FDCS does not receive monetary priority. CHOP, Gemcitabine, and Taxotere were all initially developed for other cancers, but mutually mutated pathways allow for its use in FDCS. The hallmarks of cancer have helped physicians realize that there are biological commonalities between seemingly very different cancer types that can be exploited to develop new and better treatment plans.
