= Brachial =

Brachial means "pertaining to the arm", and may refer to:

- Brachial artery, in anatomy
- Brachial fascia
- Brachial lymph nodes
- Brachial veins
- Brachial plexus, a network of nerves
- Brachial valve, the upper valve in Brachiopods
- Brachialis muscle
