= Tianjin Medical University =

Public medical university in Tianjin, China

- 天津医科大学
- Type: Public
- Established: 1951; 75 years ago
- President: Yongfeng Shang
- Faculty: 6,610
- Administrative staff: 7,943
- Students: 8,515
- Undergraduates: 5,127
- Postgraduates: 1,940
- Location: 22 Qixiangtai Road, Tianjin, Tianjin, China
- Campus: Urban
- Website: tmu.edu.cn

Tianjin Medical University (TMU; Chinese: 天津医科大学; pinyin: Tiānjīn Yīkē Dàxué) is a public medical university in Tianjin, China. It is affiliated with the City of Tianjin, and co-funded by the Tianjin Municipal People's Government, the National Health Commission, and the Ministry of Education. The university is part of Project 211 and the Double First-Class Construction.

Founded in 1951 as Tianjin Medical College, the school was the first medical institution approved by the State Council. Hsien-I Chu, a renowned endocrinologist, was the first president of the university.

In December 1993, with the approval of the State Education Council, the Tianjin Medical College and the Tianjin Second Medical College were integrated into Tianjin Medical University. The university was accredited by the State Council Academic Degree Committee to confer bachelor's degrees, master's degrees, and doctorates in 1981 and was permitted to set up seven-year medical program in 1988.

The university is listed in International Medical Education Directory (IMED).

== Campus ==
The total area occupied by the university is 400,000 square meters. The university now has 7,493 staff, in which there are 6,610 professionals. 1,468 professionals hold senior position. It has 8,515 students: 1,940 postgraduates (347 doctor's degree students MD.& PHD., 1,593 master's degree students M.Sc.), 5,127 undergraduates(B.Sc.), 494 junior-college students and over 954 international students.

=== Library ===
The University Library has collection of 510 thousand volumes and 3 thousand kinds of journals, which was designated as Central Library by the Ministry of Health. The computer network including Internet has been opened for medical education, Long-distance Medical Education, E-mail, Document Transit, etc.

== Departments ==
TMU includes eight departments involved in 15 specialties such as Clinical Medicine, Anesthesiology etc. but also Integration of Traditional Chinese Medicine and Western medicine and Medical Humanities.

The university has 6 university hospitals (affiliated hospitals), 11 clinical colleges, and over thirty teaching hospitals.

== Disciplines ==
The university has a number of State-level Key Disciplines and Local-level Key Disciplines. The Clinical Integration of Traditional Chinese medicine and Western Medicine (Surgery) is a State-level Key Discipline. The eight Local-level Key Disciplines are Endocrinology and Metabolic Disease, Oncology, Neurology, Medical Imaging, Urinary Surgery, Cardiovascular Diseases, Nuclear Medicine and General Surgery. Three Local-level Key Development Disciplines are Microbiology and Immunology, Ophthalmology and Stomatology. The university has nine Research Institutions, one Key Laboratory of Ministry of Health and nine Clinical Pharmacology Center of Ministry of Health. Over the recent ten years, about three hundred medical researches passed the appraisals and eleven researches won the national awards.

== Scholarships ==
The university offers several kinds of scholarships: People Scholarship, Zhu Xianyi Scholarships, Chen Lude Nursing Scholarship, Wang Kechang Scholarship, Science and Engineering Scholarship, Tianjin Takeda Scholarship, Jianxuyunzhu Medical Scholarship.

== International Education College ==
On 21 December 2007, Tianjin Medical University celebrated a decade since accepting the first batch of foreign students into the English program. The university has the largest foreign population with students from over 24 countries. New students arrive usually in Fall, however some applicants arrive in Spring to obtain an early start in learning Chinese. Learning Chinese is compulsory for every student as it is required to converse with patients during hospital visits and clinical and also for getting around. It is incorporated into first two years of the medical syllabus.

== Cancer Institute and Hospital ==
Tianjin Medical University Cancer Institute and Hospital (TMUCIH) is the birthplace of oncology in China. For half a century, the hospital has developed into one of the largest cancer centers in China. The hospital was established in 1861 with the name of "London Christian Church Hospital. Jin Xian-Zhai, the well-known oncologist, set up the first tumor ward in the hospital in 1952 and in 1972, the hospital became a specialized cancer hospital with 341 beds. In 1977, the Institute of Cancer Research was established with 8 departments. Today, Tianjin Medical University Cancer Institute and Hospital is one of the largest bases for cancer prevention, treatment, training and research in China.

Tianjin Medical University is currently constructing the largest cancer prevention, treatment and research base in Asia. On June 27, construction of the comprehensive cancer prevention and treatment research center, with a gross floor area of 93,000-square meters, started at Tianjin Medical University Cancer Institute and Hospital. Upon completion, the hospital will have 1,800 beds, be able to serve 500,000 outpatients, and perform over 20,000 surgical operations annually.

The hospital will become the largest cancer prevention, treatment and research base in Asia, incorporating fundamental oncological research, clinical treatment and high-end training.

The center plans to make a breakthrough in integrating clinical treatment and scientific research; seven clinical research centers will be constructed, with a view to realizing a "seamless interconnection" between clinical treatment and scientific research.

== International collaboration ==
The University of Texas M. D. Anderson Cancer Center and Tianjin Medical University Cancer Institute and Hospital, in Tianjin, China, on June 7, 2006, announced an agreement to expand opportunities for collaborations in clinical, educational and translational cancer research, building upon professional relationships between physicians and scientists at both institutions that have spanned over a decade. The agreement formalizes a cooperative framework to develop joint programs that support the institutions' shared missions of eradicating cancer worldwide through scientific discovery, advanced patient therapies, education and prevention.

In 2009, the Center for Molecular Medicine of Karolinska University Hospital and Tianjin Medical University announced an agreement to build the Sino-Swedish Center for Molecular Medicine.

Tianjin Medical University has also more than 50 partner universities in over 16 countries, 108 Guest-Professors of the famous research institutes from all over the world, such as the Johns Hopkins University.
