= Lymphoid hyperplasia =

Rapid proliferation of lymphocyte cells

Lymphoid hyperplasia is the rapid proliferation of normal lymphocytic cells that resemble lymph tissue which may occur with bacterial or viral infections. The growth is termed hyperplasia which may result in enlargement of various tissue including an organ, or cause a cutaneous lesion.

== Lymph node anatomy ==
A lymph node is small, capsulated lymphoid organ that is present along the lymphatic system. It is composed of cortex and medulla. The cortex is also divided into outer cortex and inner cortex (also known as the paracortex). The outer cortex is composed of follicles of B cells so that it is called the B-cell zone. Similarly, the inner cortex has T cells and is called the T-cell zone.

== Cutaneous hyperplasia ==
Cutaneous lymphoid lesions may be observed in follicular, granulomatous or lymphoreticular pathologic patterns. Cutaneous lymphoid hyperplasia is generally not malignant, but in rare cases an association has been observed.

== Follicular hyperplasia ==
Follicular hyperplasia is a stimulation of the B cell compartment. It is caused by an abnormal proliferation of secondary follicles and occurs principally in the cortex without broaching the lymph node capsule. The follicles are cytologically polymorphous, are often polarized, and vary in size and shape. Follicular hyperplasia must be distinguished from follicular lymphoma (bcl-2 protein is expressed in neoplastic follicles, but not reactive follicles).

== Paracortical hyperplasia ==
Paracortical hyperplasia is the preferential stimulation of the T cell compartment. It is caused by an abnormal expansion of the interfollicular zones but is confined within the lymph node capsule. The population of the compartment is cytologically polymorphous. Paracortical hyperplasia may be accompanied by vascular proliferation. Must be distinguished from monomorphous T cell lymphoma.

== Sinus hyperplasia ==
Sinus hyperplasia is the preferential stimulation of the histiocytic (tissues macrophage) compartment. Histological features include distention or engorgement of both subcapsular and intraparenchymal sinuses by benign histiocytes which may be hemophagocytic. Sinus hyperplasia may be associated with non-hematolymphoid malignancy. Other features include presence of white spaces and lymphocytes (large cells) within sinuses.

== Complications ==
It is one common source of appendicitis, as it may cause an obstruction of the appendiceal lumen, resulting in the subsequent filling of the appendix with mucus, causing it to distend and internal pressure to increase. Other rare case reports describe upper airway obstruction and systemic autoimmune disease.

== See also ==
- Hyperplasia
- Reactive lymphadenopathy
