= Pectoral axillary lymph nodes =

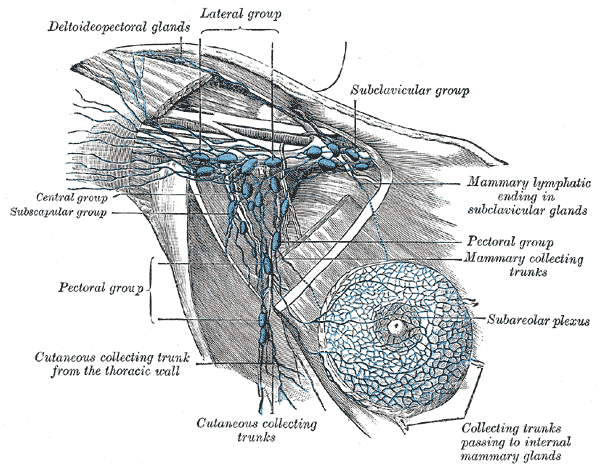
- Lymphatics of the mamma, and the axillary glands

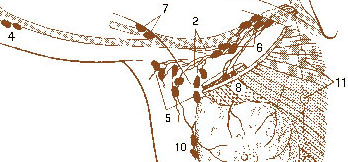
- 2. Axillary lymphatic plexus 4. Cubital lymph nodes (not part of the lymph node drainage of the breast); 5. Superficial axillary (low axillary); 6. Deep axillary lymph nodes 7. Brachial axillary lymph nodes 8. Interpectoral axillary lymph nodes (Rotter nodes); 10. Paramammary or intramammary lymph nodes 11. Parasternal lymph nodes (internal mammary nodes)

Details
- System: Lymphatic system
- Drains to: Central lymph nodes

Identifiers
- Latin: nodi lymphoidei axillares pectorales
- TA98: A13.3.01.006
- TA2: 5241
- FMA: 14188 71748, 14188

An anterior or pectoral group consists of four or five glands along the lower border of the Pectoralis minor, in relation with the lateral thoracic artery.

Their afferents drain the skin and muscles of the anterior and lateral thoracic walls, and the central and lateral parts of the mamma; their efferents pass partly to the central and partly to the subclavicular groups of axillary glands.

== Additional images ==
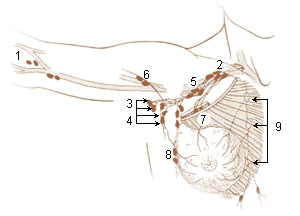
Lymph nodes of the upper limb and breast
