= Subscapular axillary lymph nodes =

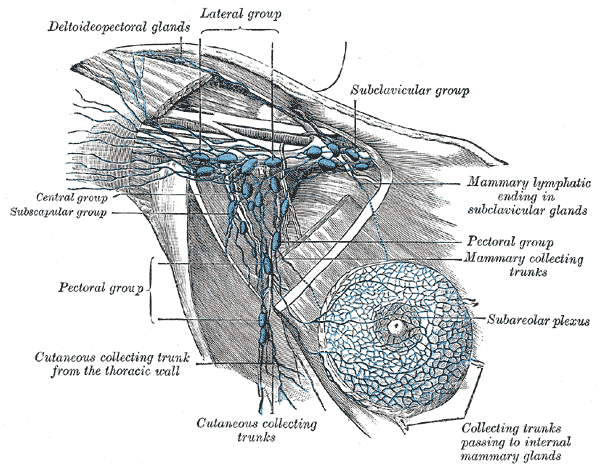
- Lymphatics of the mamma, and the axillary glands

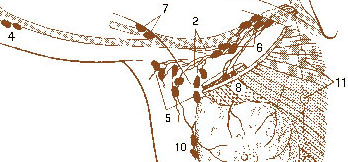
- 2. Axillary lymphatic plexus 4. Cubital lymph nodes (not part of the lymph node drainage of the breast); 5. Superficial axillary (low axillary); 6. Deep axillary lymph nodes 7. Brachial axillary lymph nodes 8. Interpectoral axillary lymph nodes (Rotter nodes); 10. Paramammary or intramammary lymph nodes 11. Parasternal lymph nodes (internal mammary nodes)

Details
- System: Lymphatic system
- Drains to: Central lymph nodes

Identifiers
- Latin: nodi lymphoidei axillares subscapulares
- TA98: A13.3.01.005
- TA2: 5240
- FMA: 14187 71746, 14187

A posterior or subscapular group of six or seven glands is placed along the lower margin of the posterior wall of the axilla in the course of the subscapular artery.

The afferents of this group drain the skin and muscles of the lower part of the back of the neck and of the posterior thoracic wall; their efferents pass to the central group of axillary glands.

== Additional images ==
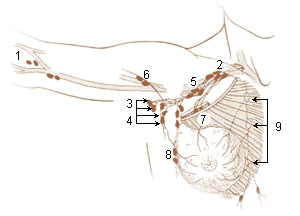
Lymph nodes of the upper limb and breast
