= Lymphadenopathy =

Abnormal change in size of the lymph nodes

- Other names: Adenopathy, swollen lymph nodes, swollen glands
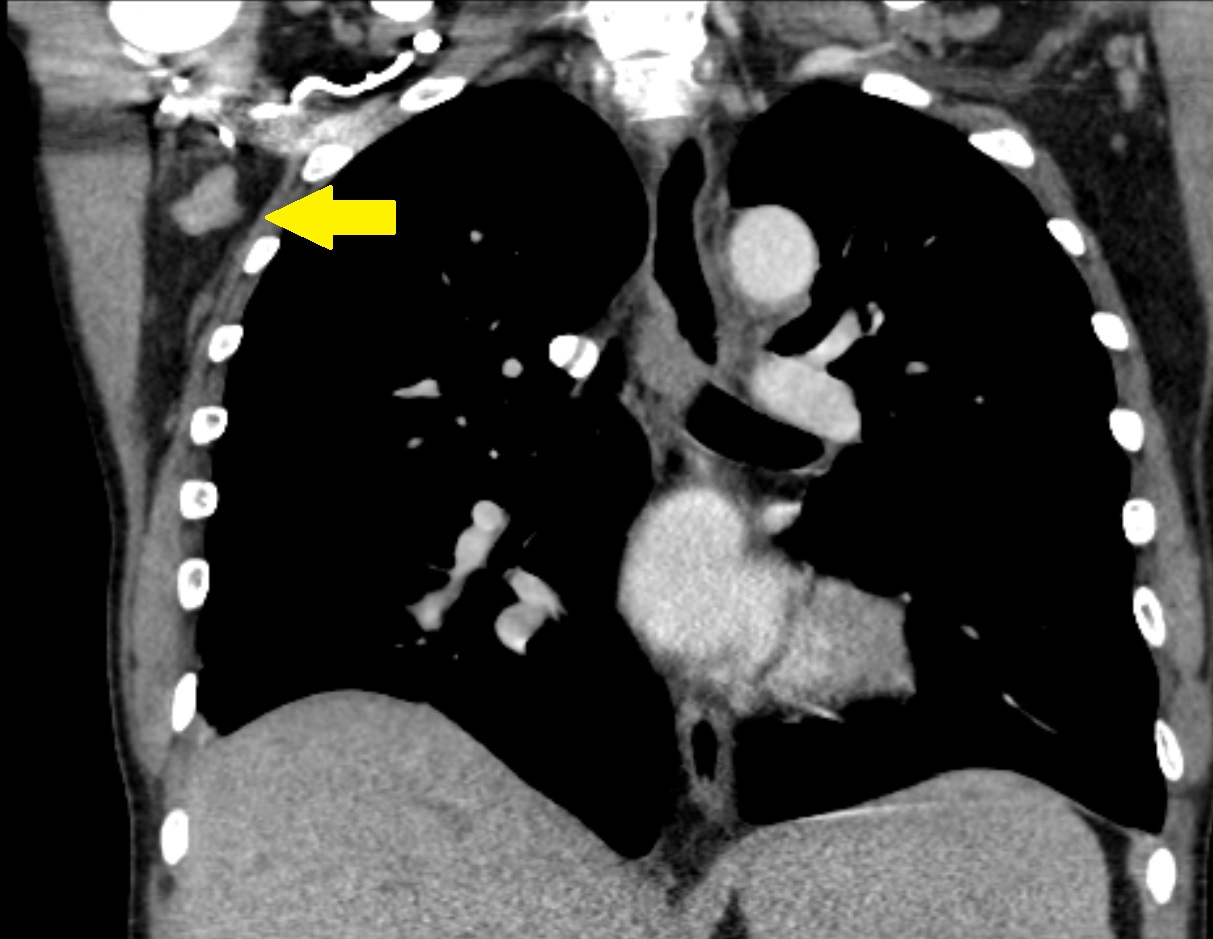
- A CT scan of axillary lymphadenopathy in a 57-year-old man with multiple myeloma.
- Specialty: Infectious disease, oncology
- Symptoms: Fever; Hard, fixed, rapidly growing nodes, indicating a possible cancer or lymphoma; night sweats; runny nose; sore throat
- Causes: Infections; autoimmune diseases; malignancies; histiocytoses; storage diseases; benign hyperplasia; drug reactions
- Risk factors: Back pain; constipation; urinary frequency
- Diagnostic method: CT scan; MRI scan; ultrasound

Lymphadenopathy or adenopathy is a disease of the lymph nodes, in which they are abnormal in size or consistency. Lymphadenopathy of an inflammatory type (the most common type) is lymphadenitis, producing swollen or enlarged lymph nodes. In clinical practice, the distinction between lymphadenopathy and lymphadenitis is rarely made and the words are usually treated as synonymous. Inflammation of the lymphatic vessels is known as lymphangitis. Infectious lymphadenitis affecting lymph nodes in the neck is often called scrofula.

Lymphadenopathy is a common and nonspecific sign. Common causes include infections (from minor causes such as the common cold and post-vaccination swelling to serious ones such as HIV/AIDS), autoimmune diseases, and cancer. Lymphadenopathy is frequently idiopathic and self-limiting.

== Causes ==
Retroperitoneal lymphadenopathies of testicular seminoma embrace the aorta. Computed tomography image.

Lymph node enlargement is recognized as a common sign of infectious, autoimmune, or malignant disease. Examples may include:

- Reactive: acute infection (e.g., bacterial, or viral), or chronic infections (tuberculous lymphadenitis, cat-scratch disease).
  - The most distinctive sign of bubonic plague is extreme swelling of one or more lymph nodes that bulge out of the skin as "buboes". The buboes often become necrotic and may even rupture.
  - Infectious mononucleosis is an acute viral infection usually caused by Epstein-Barr virus and may be characterized by a marked enlargement of the cervical lymph nodes.
  - It is also a sign of cutaneous anthrax and human African trypanosomiasis
  - Toxoplasmosis, a parasitic disease, gives a generalized lymphadenopathy (Piringer-Kuchinka lymphadenopathy).
  - Plasma cell variant of Castleman's disease - associated with HHV-8 infection and HIV infection
  - Mesenteric lymphadenitis after viral systemic infection (particularly in the GALT in the appendix) can commonly present like appendicitis.

Infectious causes of lymphadenopathy may include bacterial infections such as cat scratch disease, tularemia, brucellosis, or prevotella, as well as fungal infections such as paracoccidioidomycosis.

- Tumoral:
  - Primary: Hodgkin lymphoma and non-Hodgkin lymphoma give lymphadenopathy in all or a few lymph nodes.
  - Secondary: metastasis, Virchow's node, neuroblastoma, and chronic lymphocytic leukemia.
- Autoimmune: systemic lupus erythematosus and rheumatoid arthritis may have a generalized lymphadenopathy.
- Immunocompromised: AIDS. Generalized lymphadenopathy is an early sign of infection with human immunodeficiency virus (HIV), the virus that causes acquired immunodeficiency syndrome (AIDS). "Lymphadenopathy syndrome" has been used to describe the first symptomatic stage of HIV progression, preceding a diagnosis of AIDS.
- Bites from certain venomous snakes such as the pit viper
- Unknown: Kikuchi disease, progressive transformation of germinal centers, sarcoidosis, hyaline-vascular variant of Castleman's disease, Rosai-Dorfman disease, Kawasaki disease, Kimura disease

=== Benign (reactive) lymphadenopathy ===
Benign lymphadenopathy is a common biopsy finding, and may often be confused with malignant lymphoma. It may be separated into major morphologic patterns, each with its own differential diagnosis with certain types of lymphoma. Most cases of reactive follicular hyperplasia are easy to diagnose, but some cases may be confused with follicular lymphoma. There are seven distinct patterns of benign lymphadenopathy:

- Follicular hyperplasia: This is the most common type of reactive lymphadenopathy.
- Paracortical hyperplasia/Interfollicular hyperplasia: It is seen in viral infections, skin diseases, and nonspecific reactions.
- Sinus histiocytosis: It is seen in lymph nodes draining limbs, inflammatory lesions, and malignancies.
- Nodal extensive necrosis
- Nodal granulomatous inflammation
- Nodal extensive fibrosis (Connective tissue framework)
- Nodal deposition of interstitial substance

These morphological patterns are never pure. Thus, reactive follicular hyperplasia can have a component of paracortical hyperplasia. However, this distinction is important for the differential diagnosis of the cause.

== Diagnosis ==
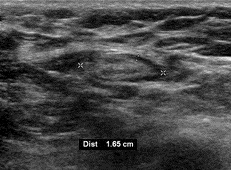
Medical ultrasonography of a typical normal lymph node: smooth, gently lobulated oval with a hypoechoic cortex measuring less than 3 mm in thickness with a central echogenic hilum.

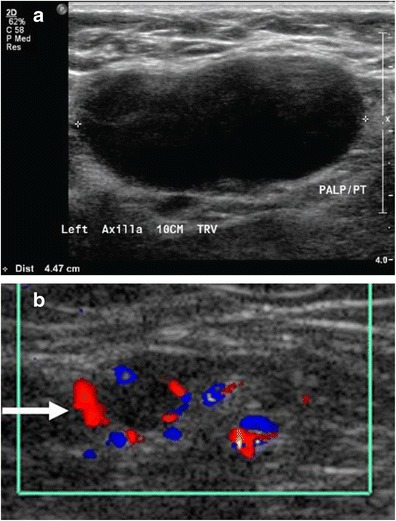
Ultrasonography of a suspected malignant lymph node: Absence of the fatty hilum; Increased focal cortical thickness greater than 3 cm; Doppler ultrasonography that shows hyperaemic blood flow in the hilum and central cortex and/or abnormal (non-hilar cortical) blood flow.

In cervical lymphadenopathy (of the neck), it is routine to perform a throat examination including the use of a mirror and an endoscope.

On ultrasound, B-mode imaging depicts lymph node morphology, whilst power Doppler can assess the vascular pattern. B-mode imaging features that can distinguish metastasis and lymphoma include size, shape, calcification, loss of hilar architecture, as well as intranodal necrosis. Soft tissue edema and nodal matting on B-mode imaging suggests tuberculous cervical lymphadenitis or previous radiation therapy. Serial monitoring of nodal size and vascularity are useful in assessing treatment response.

Fine-needle aspiration cytology (FNAC) has sensitivity and specificity percentages of 81% and 100%, respectively, in the histopathology of malignant cervical lymphadenopathy. PET-CT has proven to be helpful in identifying occult primary carcinomas of the head and neck, especially when applied as a guiding tool prior to panendoscopy, and may induce treatment related clinical decisions in up to 60% of cases.

=== Classification ===
Lymphadenopathy may be classified by:

- Size, where lymphadenopathy in adults is often defined as a short axis of one or more lymph nodes greater than 10 mm.
- Extent:
  - Localized lymphadenopathy: due to localized spot of infection; e.g., an infected spot on the scalp will cause lymph nodes in the neck on that same side to swell up
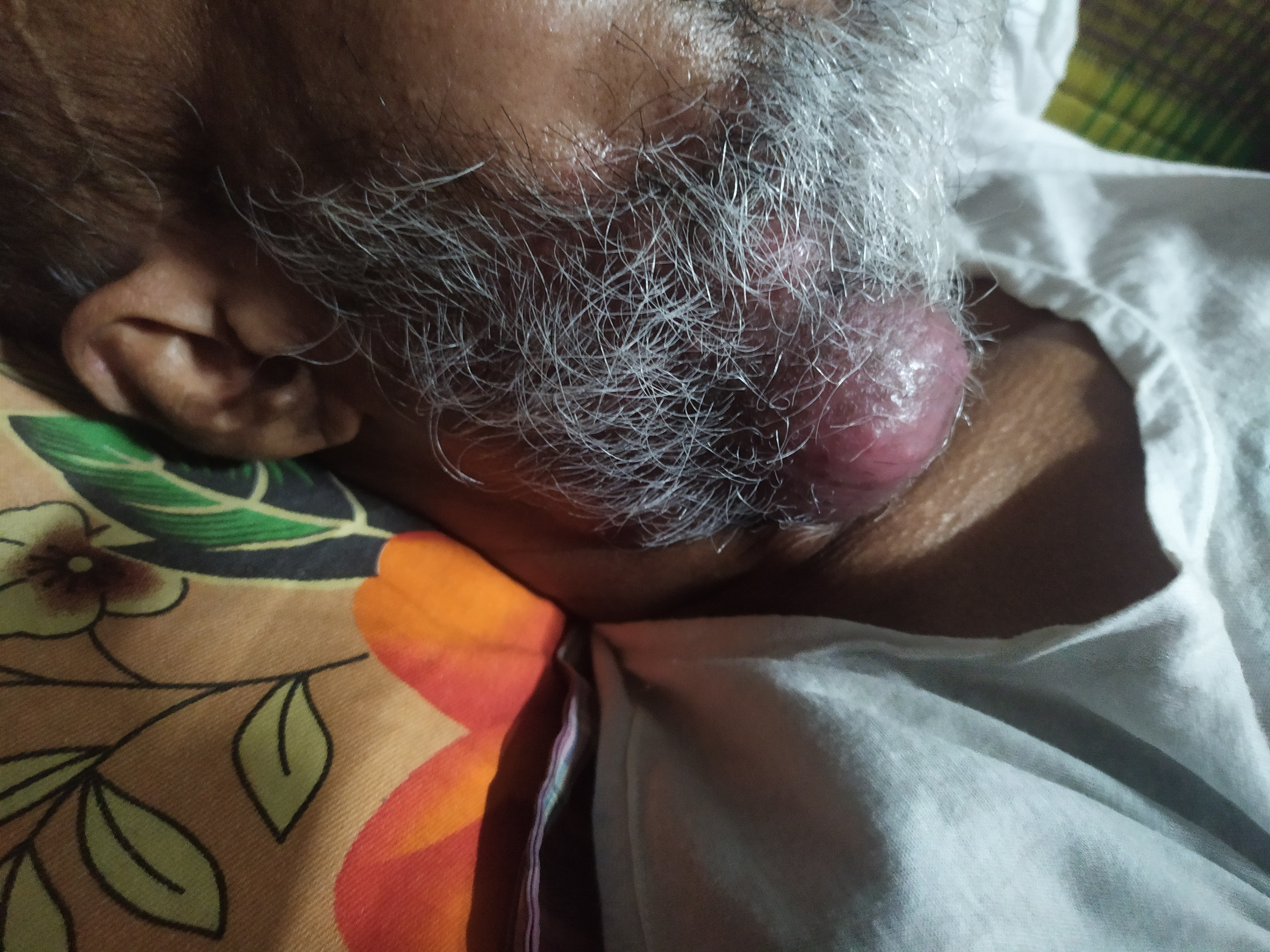
    Inflammatory localized lymphadenopathy at right mandibular angle
  - Generalized lymphadenopathy: due to a systemic infection of the body; e.g., influenza or secondary syphilis
    - Persistent generalized lymphadenopathy (PGL): persisting for a long time, possibly without an apparent cause
- Localization:
  - Hilar lymphadenopathy.
  - Mediastinal lymphadenopathy
  - Bilateral hilar lymphadenopathy
- Dermatopathic lymphadenopathy: lymphadenopathy associated with skin disease.
- Malignancy: Benign lymphadenopathy is distinguished from malignant types which mainly refer to lymphomas or lymph node metastasis.

==== Size ====
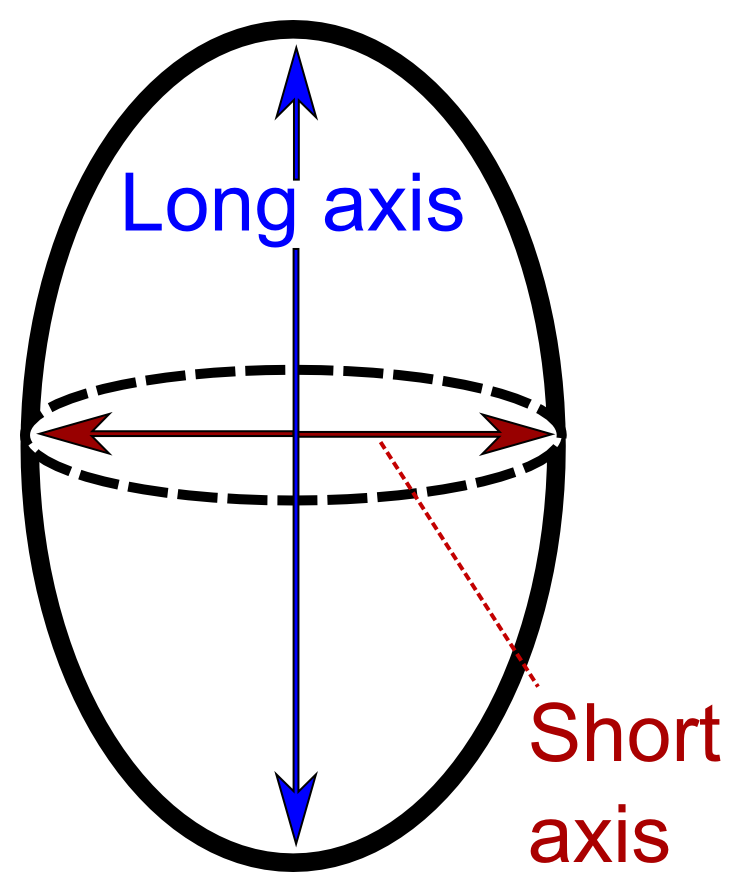

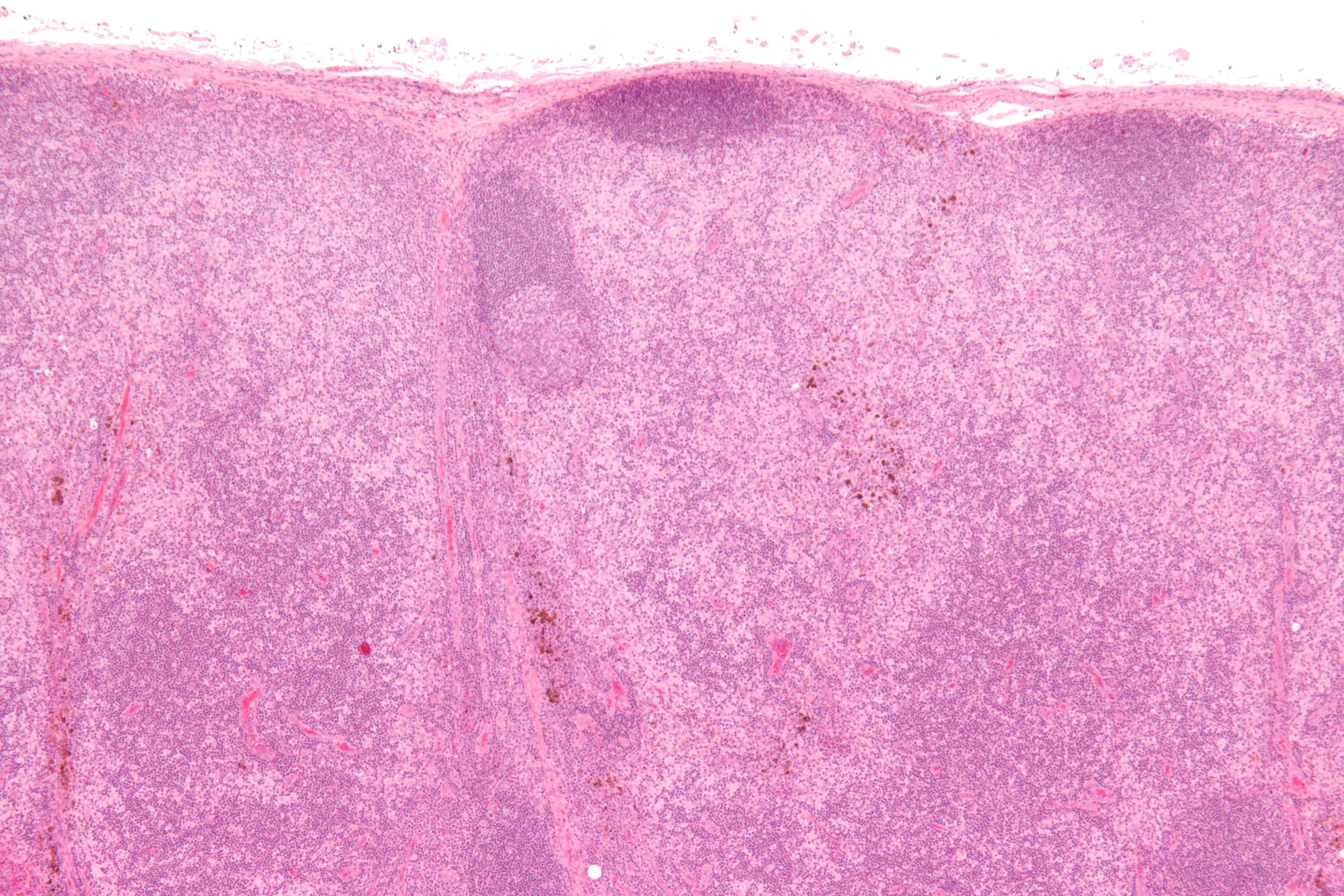
Micrograph of dermatopathic lymphadenopathy, a type of lymphadenopathy. H&E stain.

- Size, where lymphadenopathy in adults is often defined as a short axis of one or more lymph nodes greater than 10 mm. However, there is regional variation as detailed in this table:

Upper limit of lymph node sizes in adults
Generally	10 mm
Inguinal	10 – 20 mm
Pelvis	10 mm for ovoid lymph nodes, 8 mm for rounded
Neck
Generally (non-retropharyngeal)	10 mm
Jugulodigastric lymph nodes	11 mm or 15 mm
Retropharyngeal	8 mm: Lateral retropharyngeal: 5 mm
Mediastinum
Mediastinum, generally	10 mm
Superior mediastinum and high paratracheal	7 mm
Low paratracheal and subcarinal	11 mm
Upper abdominal
Retrocrural space	6 mm
Paracardiac	8 mm
Gastrohepatic ligament	8 mm
Upper paraaortic region	9 mm
Portacaval space	10 mm
Porta hepatis	7 mm
Lower paraaortic region	11 mm

Lymphadenopathy of the axillary lymph nodes can be defined as solid nodes measuring more than 15 mm without fatty hilum. Axillary lymph nodes may be normal up to 30 mm if consisting largely of fat.

In children, a short axis of 8 mm can be used. However, inguinal lymph nodes of up to 15 mm and cervical lymph nodes of up to 20 mm are generally normal in children up to age 8–12.

Lymphadenopathy of more than 1.5–2 cm increases the risk of cancer or granulomatous disease as the cause rather than only inflammation or infection. Still, an increasing size and persistence over time are more indicative of cancer.

== See also ==
- Adenitis
- Lymphovascular invasion
