= Central lymph nodes =

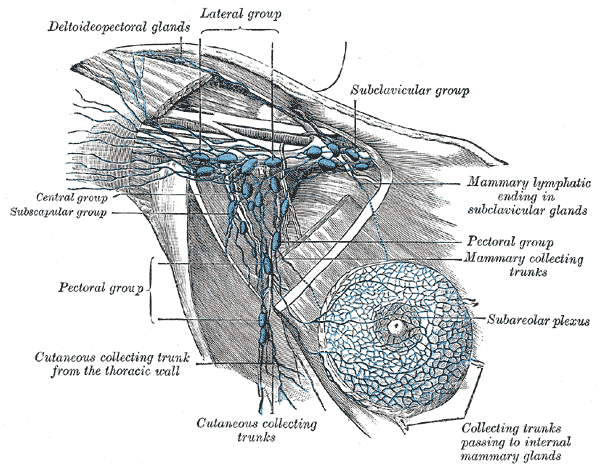
- Lymphatics of the mamma, and the axillary glands

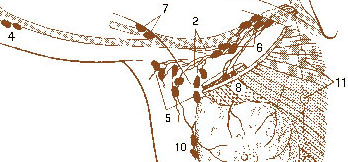
- 2. Axillary lymphatic plexus 4. Cubital lymph nodes (not part of the lymph node drainage of the breast); 5. Superficial axillary (low axillary); 6. Deep axillary lymph nodes 7. Brachial axillary lymph nodes 8. Interpectoral axillary lymph nodes (Rotter nodes); 10. Paramammary or intramammary lymph nodes 11. Parasternal lymph nodes (internal mammary nodes)

Details
- System: Lymphatic system
- Source: Brachial, pectoral axillary, subscapular axillary
- Drains to: Apical

Identifiers
- Latin: nodi lymphoidei axillares centrales
- TA98: A13.3.01.007
- TA2: 5238
- FMA: 14189 71749, 14189

The central lymph nodes or intermediate group of lymph nodes are three or four large lymph nodes imbedded in the adipose tissue near the base of the axilla. They lay in a groove between the Esophagus, Trachea, and Thyroid.

Its afferent lymphatic vessels are the efferent vessels of all the preceding groups of axillary lymph nodes; its efferents pass to the subclavicular group. The central lymph nodes are smaller in diameter compared to the lateral lymph nodes

== Additional images ==
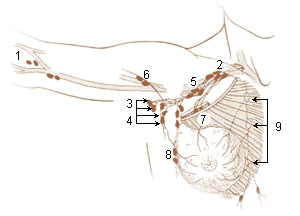
Lymph nodes of the upper limb and breast
