= Rotter's lymph nodes =

Rotter's lymph nodes are small interpectoral lymph nodes located between the pectoralis major and pectoralis minor muscles. They receive lymphatic fluid from the muscles and the mammary gland and deliver lymphatic fluid to the axillary lymphatic plexus. These lymph nodes are susceptible to breast cancer, as the cancer sometimes spreads (metastasizes) to the interpectoral lymph nodes. It signifies retrograde spread of tumor. Rotter's lymph nodes are named after German surgeon Josef Rotter (1857-1924), who described them in the late 19th century.

== See also ==
- Lymphatic system
