= Tianjin Medical University Cancer Institute and Hospital =

Hospital in Tianjin, China

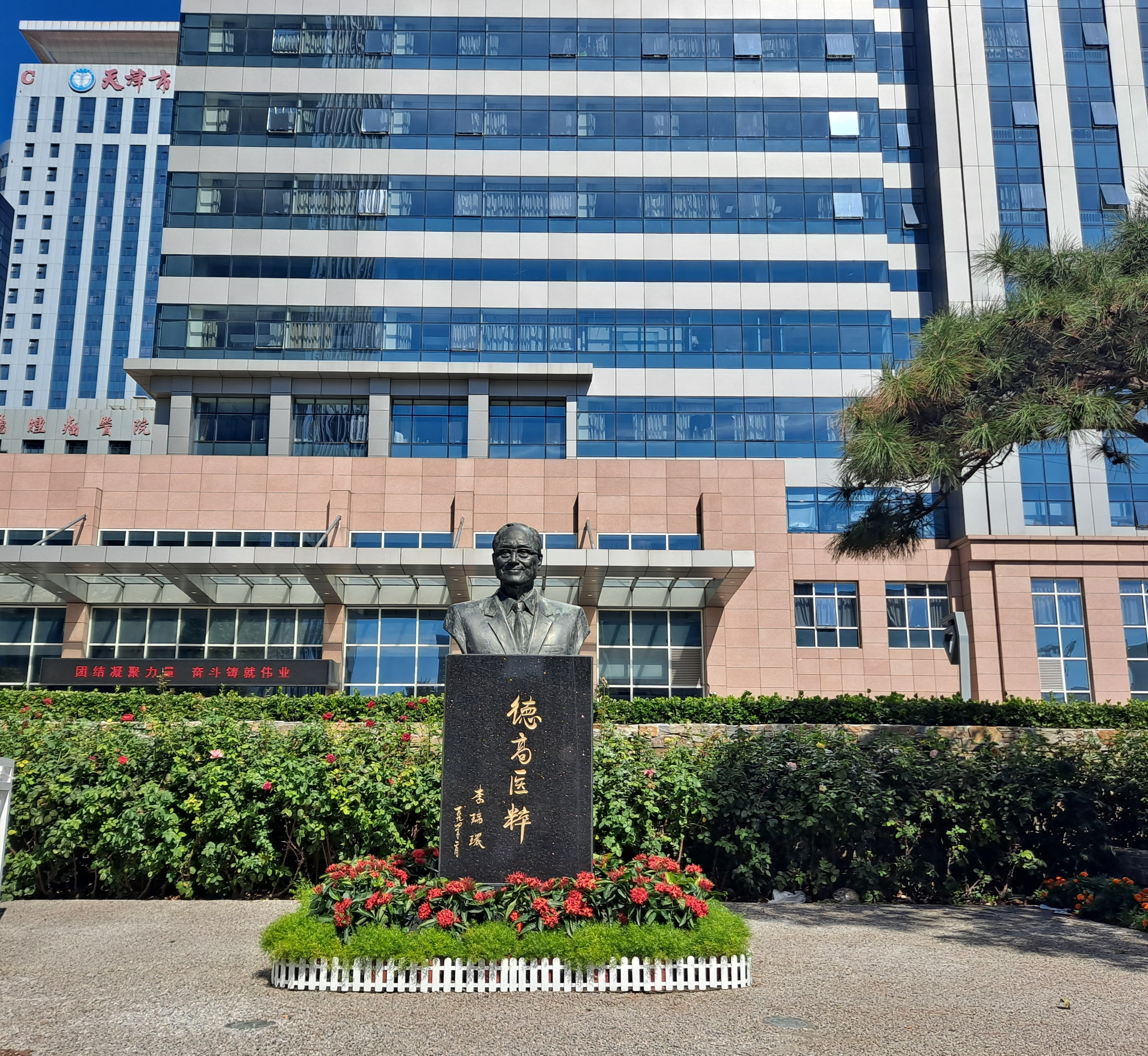
Tianjin Medical University Cancer Institute and Hospital

Tianjin Medical University Cancer Institute and Hospital (TMUCIH) (Chinese: 天津医科大学附属肿瘤医院) is a specialized tertiary cancer hospital located in Hexi District, Tianjin, China. It is affiliated with Tianjin Medical University and supervised by the Tianjin Municipal Health Commission. The hospital's origins can be traced back to a field clinic established by the British garrison in Tianjin in 1861, following the establishment of the British concession in Tianjin. On December 1, 1868, management was transferred to the London Missionary Society, and the facility was renamed the "London Missionary Society Clinic". In 1879, British missionary John Kenneth Mackenzie took charge of the clinic and, after curing Li Hongzhang's wife, received donations to expand the institution into the "London Missionary Society Hospital". In 1924, it was renamed "Dr. Mackenzie Memorial Hospital" in his honor. After the founding of the People's Republic of China, the Tianjin Municipal People's Government took over the hospital and renamed it "Tianjin Municipal People's Hospital". In 1952, the hospital established China’s first oncology department, becoming a pioneering institution in Chinese oncology. The hospital gradually evolved into a cancer-focused hospital, officially adopting the name "Tianjin Cancer Hospital" in 1988 and later the extended name "Tianjin Medical University Cancer Institute and Hospital" in 1997. It was designated a Class A tertiary hospital in 1993 and a National Clinical Research Center for Malignant Tumors in 2013. The hospital operates several branches, including Tianjin Cancer Hospital Konggang Hospital, Binhai Hospital, and the upcoming Qinhuangdao Hospital in Beidaihe District, Qinhuangdao. It also publishes the academic journal Chinese Journal of Clinical Oncology.

== History ==
The history of Tianjin Cancer Hospital can be traced back to 1861, when a field clinic was established by the British garrison stationed in Tianjin. On December 1, 1868, the clinic came under the administration of the London Missionary Society and was renamed the "London Missionary Society Hospital." It became one of the earliest Western medicine hospitals in China at the time. The hospital's operations were mainly funded through donations from local bureaucrats, gentry, merchants, compradors, and contributions solicited from patients.

On January 18, 1924, the new hospital building was officially named "Dr. Mackenzie Memorial Hospital" in honor of Dr. John Kenneth Mackenzie. The name "Dr. Mackenzie Memorial Hospital".

In 1940, the hospital was occupied by the Japanese army and renamed "Tongrenkai Tianjin Clinic." In 1945, the Tianjin Municipal Government (Republic of China) renamed it the "Provisional Tianjin First Hospital." On December 1, 1945, the Tianjin Municipal Government returned the hospital to the London Missionary Society and restored its former name.

Jin Xianzhai, the well-known oncologist, set up the first tumor ward in the hospital in 1952. In 1972, the hospital became a specialized cancer hospital with 341 beds. In 1977, the Institute of Cancer Research was established with eight departments. The institute is dedicated to cancer research, treatment, and prevention. The institute was established by Professor Jin Xianzhai, a prominent Chinese oncologist, it originated as the Cancer Prevention Research Laboratory within Tianjin People's Hospital. Over the years, it has evolved and expanded its scope, eventually becoming a significant player in the field of oncology.

In 2013, Tianjin Cancer Hospital was approved to establish the National Clinical Research Center for Malignant Tumors.

In 2017, Tianjin Cancer Hospital established the Tianjin Cancer Hospital Konggang Branch at No. 99, Fifth East Road, Tianjin Airport Economic Area.

On 13 July 2020, TMUCIH signed an agreement on cooperation with the National Cancer Center Hospital in Japan.

In January 2022, the Tianjin Cancer Hospital Binhai Branch was established in the Huanggang Ecological Zone of Xinjia Garden, Binhai New Area. In June 2024, Tianjin Cancer Hospital selected a site in Beidaihe District, Qinhuangdao City, to construct the Tianjin Cancer Hospital Qinhuangdao Branch.

== Cancer prevention and treatment research center ==
Tianjin Medical University is constructing the largest cancer prevention, treatment, and research base in Asia. On June 27, 1989 construction of the comprehensive cancer prevention and treatment research center, with a gross floor area of 93,000 square meters, started at Tianjin Medical University Cancer Institute and Hospital. Upon completion, the hospital will have 1,800 beds, be able to serve 500,000 outpatients, and perform over 20,000 surgical operations annually.

In 2017, Oncology was ranked as the National "world class" Academic Development by the Ministry of Education, Ministry of Finance and the National Development and reform commission.

== Departments and Facilities ==
Tianjin Cancer Hospital operates a total of 36 clinical departments, including: Department of Pulmonary Oncology, Department of Esophageal Oncology, Department of Minimally Invasive Esophageal Surgery, Department of Hepatobiliary Oncology, Department of Pancreatic Oncology, Department of Gastric Oncology, Department of Colorectal Oncology, Department of Urologic Oncology, Department of Gynecologic Oncology, Breast Oncology Department I, Breast Oncology Department II, Breast Oncology Department III, Department of Breast Reconstruction, Department of Maxillofacial, Otolaryngology and Head & Neck Oncology, Department of Thyroid and Neck Oncology, Department of Bone and Soft Tissue Oncology, Department of Pediatric Oncology, Department of Neuro-oncology, Department of Interventional Oncology, Department of Anesthesiology, Department of Lymphoma, Department of Breast Medical Oncology, Department of Pulmonary Medical Oncology, Department of Gastrointestinal Medical Oncology, Department of Hepatobiliary Medical Oncology, Department of Biological Oncology, Department of Hematology, Department of Integrated Traditional Chinese and Western Medicine, Department of Radiation Therapy, VIP Ward A, Special Needs Ward, Intensive Care Unit (ICU), Department of Pain Management, Outpatient and Emergency Department, Phase I Clinical Trial Ward, and Department of Nutrition.

The hospital also has 15 medical and technical departments: Department of Pathology, Department of Pharmacy, Department of Laboratory Medicine, Department of Radiology, Department of Ultrasound Diagnosis and Therapy, Breast Pathology Laboratory, Health Management Center, Department of Molecular Imaging and Nuclear Medicine, Medical Records Department, Department of Breast Imaging Diagnosis, Outpatient Surgery Room, Department of Endoscopy, Department of Cardiopulmonary Function Testing, Department of Transfusion Medicine, and Center for Precision Oncology Testing and Translational Medicine.

Additionally, the hospital houses one medical research institution: the National Clinical Research Center for Malignant Tumors.

== Quick Facts ==
The Main Campus of the Hospital has a land space of 69,000m^{2} and building area of 175,052m^{2}. As of 2018, there have been 1,224,629 outpatient visits and 103,123 in-patient visits. As of 2019, there are 2,319 beds and a staff of 2,968 employees. There are in total 3 locations of the Tianjin Medical Institute including the main campus, Airport Free Trade Zone Hospital, and the Binhai Hospital.
