= Hyen-taik Kimm =

Chinese oncologist (1904–1990)

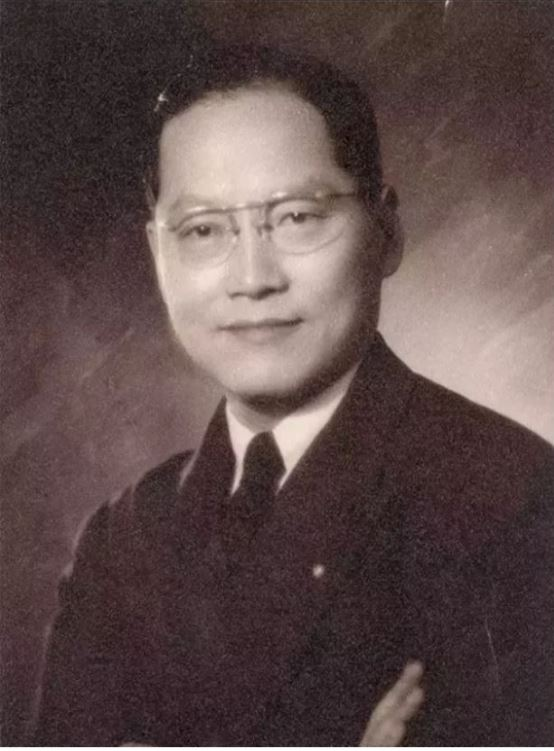
- Kimm in the 1930s
- Born: 7 March 1904; Seoul, Korean Empire
- Died: 4 September 1990 (aged 86); Tianjin, China
- Resting place: Tianjin, China
- Education: Peking Union Medical College
- Spouse: Wu Peiqiu (吴佩球)
- Children: 3
- Scientific career
- Fields: Oncology
- Workplaces: Tianjin Medical University Cancer Institute and Hospital

Chinese name
- Chinese: 金显宅
Transcriptions
Standard Mandarin
- Hanyu Pinyin: Jīn Xiǎnzhái

Korean name
- Hangul: 김현택
- Hanja: 金显宅
Transcriptions
- Revised Romanization: Gim Hyeontaek
- McCune–Reischauer: Kim Hyŏnt'aek

Hyen-taik Kimm (Korean: 김현택; Chinese: 金显宅; 7 March 1904 – 4 September 1990) was a Korean-Chinese physician that specialized in oncology. In China, he is remembered as the "Father of Chinese Oncology" for his many pioneering contributions to the field in the country as a researcher, educator, and practitioner. He was the first oncologist in China, created the first Chinese oncology journal, the Chinese Journal of Clinical Oncology (中国肿瘤临床), and the first Chinese oncologist organization, the Anti-Cancer Society of China (中国抗癌协会).

In 1937, Kimm and C. Szeto made the first description of Kimura's disease.

== Early life and education ==
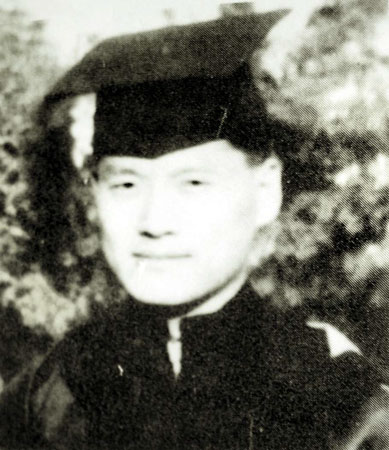
Hyen-taik Kimm

Kimm was born on 7 March 1904 in Seoul, Korean Empire to an ethnic Korean family. In 1919, Kimm participated in the nationwide March 1st Movement protests against the Japanese colonial occupation of Korea. In order to evade arrest, he was sent by his father to Shanghai, China, where Kimm's older brother operated a clinic.

His older brother funded his education at an American Baptist school in Shanghai. Later, Kimm enrolled in pre-medical studies at the University of Shanghai. In 1926, he was admitted to Peking Union Medical College, which was founded by the Rockefeller Foundation in Beijing in 1921. Kimm obtained his Chinese citizenship in 1930 and obtained his American Doctor of Medicine degree in 1931.

== Career ==
Kimm became a physician of Peking Union Medical College Hospital after graduation. In 1933, American doctors there created the first cancer ward in China. Kimm became a lead oncologist of the ward next year, making him the first Chinese person to study and practice oncology.

In 1937, he was sent to Memorial Sloan Kettering Cancer Center in New York to study pathology under James Ewing. Around this time, he and C. Szeto published the first description of Kimura's disease. For this paper and others he published in English, Kim maintained his Korean identity by writing his name in English as "Hyen-taik Kimm" or "H.T. Kimm".

One year later, he went to Chicago to study clinical oncology, focusing on radiation oncology and surgical oncology. In 1939, he returned to Beijing and was promoted to the director of the cancer ward and appointed as associate professor.

In 1941, after the Attack on Pearl Harbor, the Japanese occupied the American-operated Peking Union Medical College Hospital in Beijing. Kimm and his Chinese colleagues were forced to move to Tianjin. In 1945, after the end of World War II, he went to study in Chicago for more than one year.

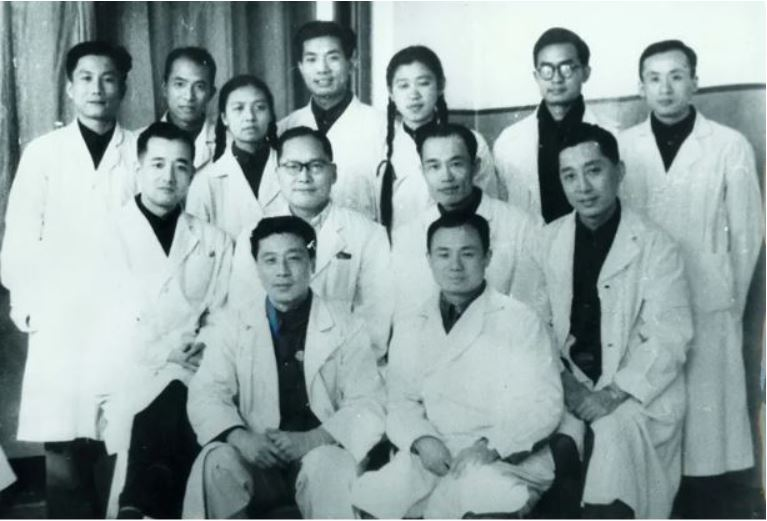
Kimm and his students (1954)

In 1951, the government of China took over the Tianjin Medical University Cancer Institute and Hospital established by John Kenneth MacKenzie in Tianjin. One year later, Kimm established the first cancer ward there, and later turned the hospital into one that specialized in cancer treatments.

From 1954, at the request of the China Ministry of Health, he began to offer oncology training programs annually to nationally selected physicians. Many of his students later turned into leading oncologists throughout the country.

He joined the Chinese Communist Party at the age of 81 and led the establishment of the China Anti-Cancer Association (CACA) around this time.

== Death and legacy ==
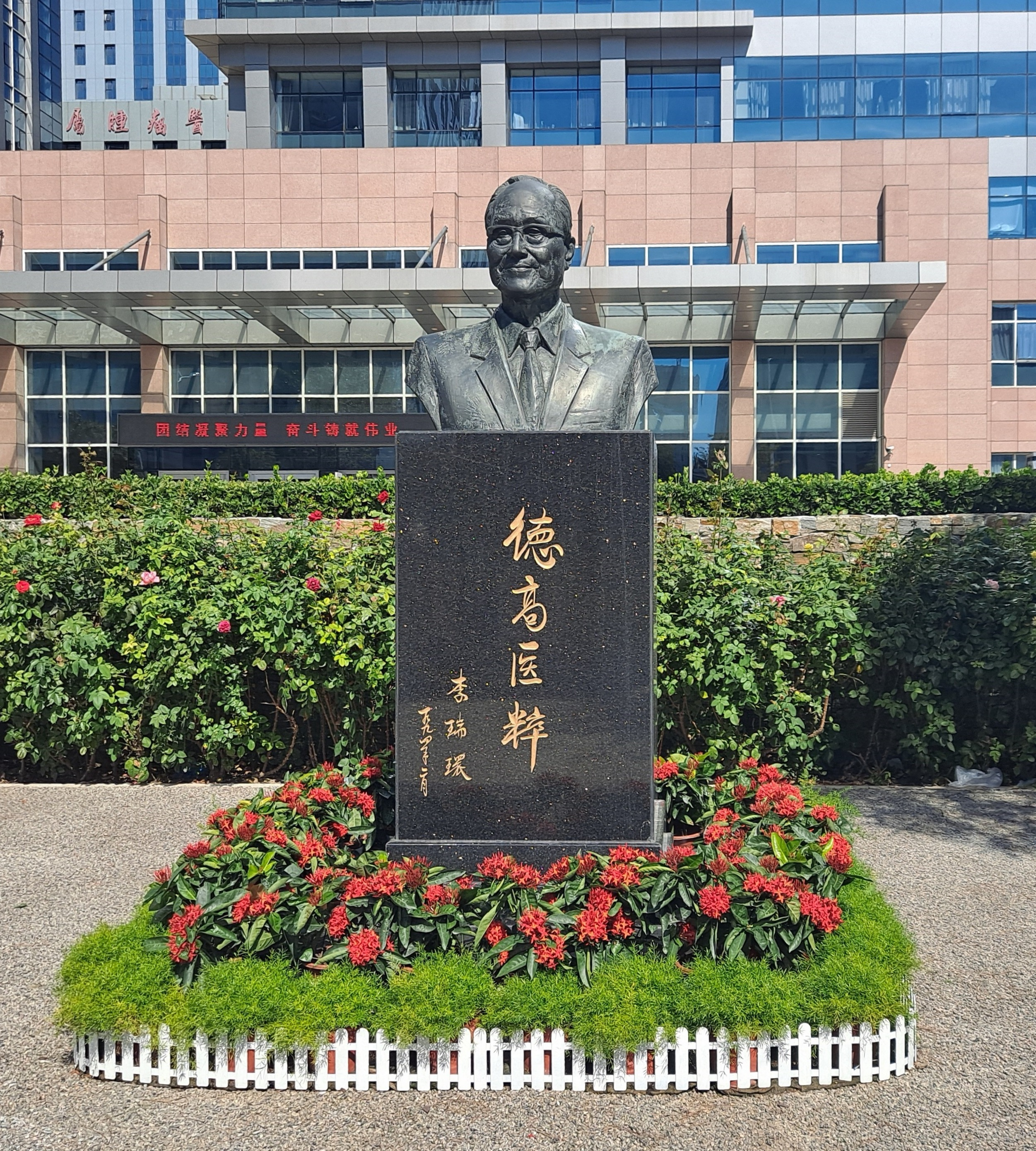
bronze statue of Hyen-taik Kimm at Tianjin Medical University Cancer Institute and Hospital

Kimm died of sepsis on 4 September 1990, in Tianjin.

He was called the "Father of Chinese Oncology" for his contributions to the study of oncology in China at the Tianjin Academic Exchange Conference in 1989. In 1994, a bronze statue of him was erected at Tianjin Medical University Cancer Institute and Hospital. In 2004, the Chinese government issued a stamp in honor of the 100th anniversary of his birth.
