= Axillary lymph nodes =

Lymph nodes in the human armpit

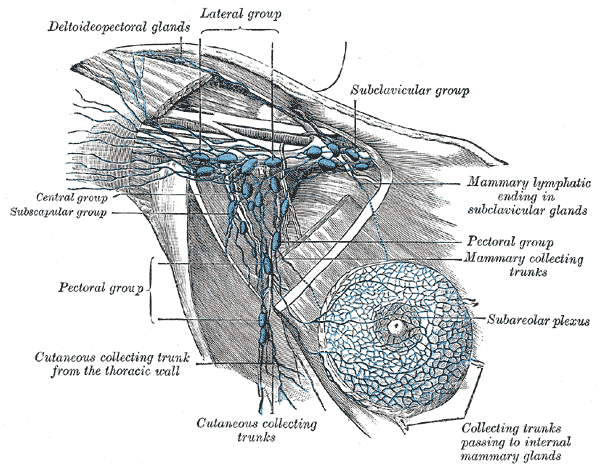
- Lymphatics of the breast and the axillary glands

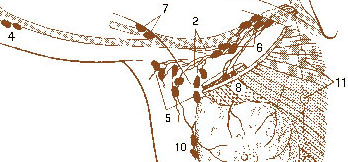
- 2. Axillary lymphatic plexus 4. Cubital lymph nodes (not part of the lymph node drainage of the breast); 5. Superficial axillary (low axillary); 6. Deep axillary lymph nodes 7. Brachial axillary lymph nodes 8. Interpectoral axillary lymph nodes (Rotter nodes); 10. Paramammary or intramammary lymph nodes 11. Parasternal lymph nodes (internal mammary nodes)

Details
- System: Lymphatic system
- Drains from: Axilla

Identifiers
- Latin: nodi lymphoidei axillares
- TA98: A13.3.01.002
- TA2: 5236
- FMA: 12771

The axillary lymph nodes or armpit lymph nodes are lymph nodes in the human armpit. Between 20 and 49 in number, they drain lymph vessels from the lateral quadrants of the breast, the superficial lymph vessels from thin walls of the chest and the abdomen above the level of the navel, and the vessels from the upper limb. They are divided in several groups according to their location in the armpit. These lymph nodes are clinically significant in breast cancer, and metastases from the breast to the axillary lymph nodes are considered in the staging of the disease.

== Structure ==
The axillary lymph nodes are arranged in six groups:

1. Anterior (pectoral) group: Lying along the lower border of the pectoralis minor behind the pectoralis major, these nodes receive lymph vessels from the lateral quadrants of the breast and superficial vessels from the anterolateral abdominal wall above the level of the umbilicus.
2. Posterior (subscapular) group: Lying in front of the subscapularis muscle, these nodes receive superficial lymph vessels from the back, down as far as the level of the iliac crests.
3. Lateral group: Lying along the medial side of the axillary vein, these nodes receive most of the lymph vessels of the upper limb (except those superficial vessels draining the lateral side—see infraclavicular nodes, below).
4. Central group: Lying in the center of the axilla in the axillary fat, these nodes receive lymph from the above three groups.
5. Infraclavicular (deltopectoral) group: These nodes are not strictly axillary nodes because they are located outside the axilla. They lie in the groove between the deltoid and pectoralis major muscles and receive superficial lymph vessels from the lateral side of the hand, forearm, and arm.
6. Apical group: Lying at the apex of the axilla at the lateral border of the 1st rib, these nodes receive the efferent lymph vessels from all the other axillary nodes.

The apical nodes drain into the subclavian lymph trunk. On the left side, this trunk drains into the thoracic duct; on the right side, it drains into the right lymphatic duct. Alternatively, the lymph trunks may drain directly into one of the large veins at the root of the neck.

== Breast cancer ==
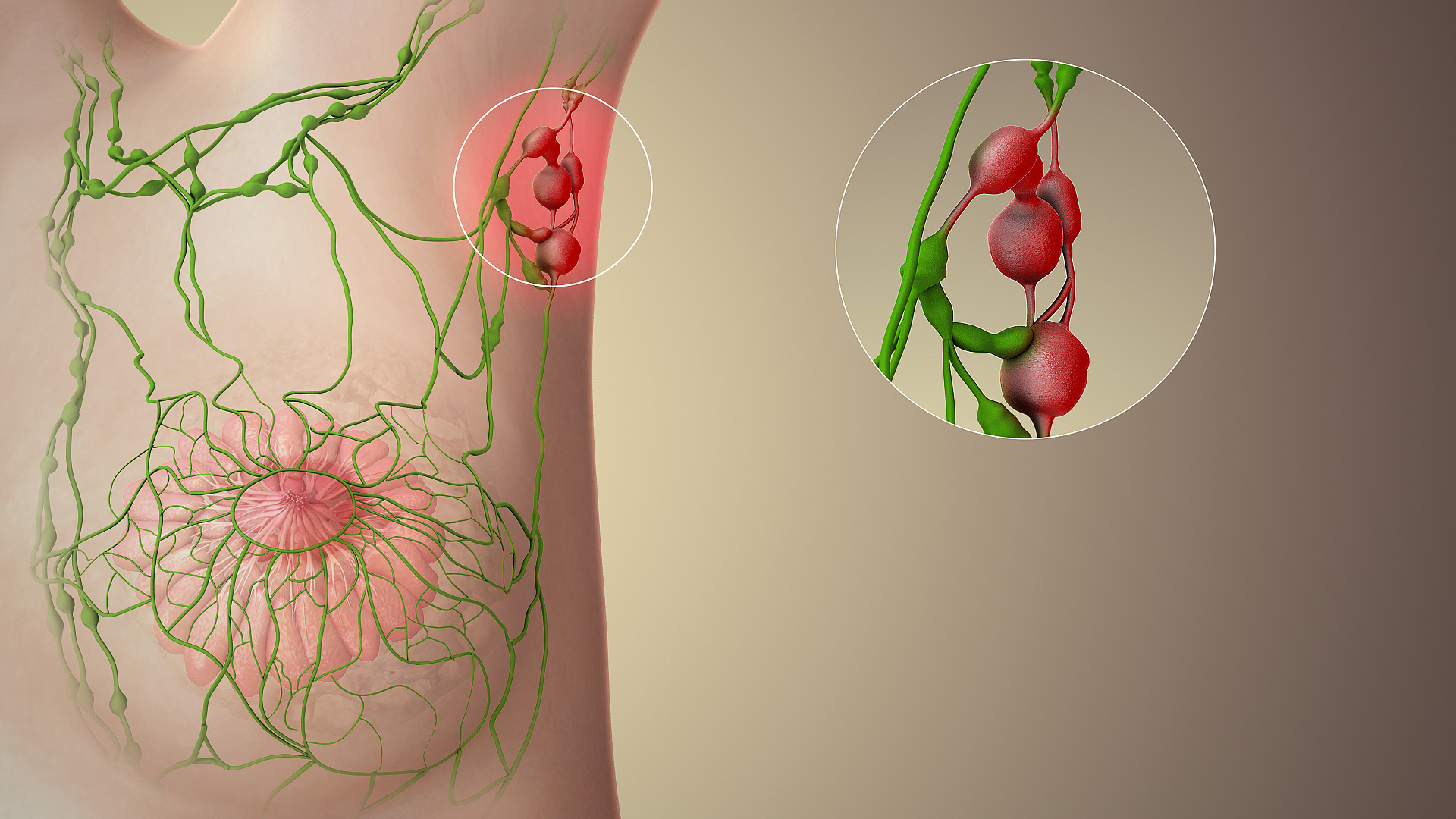
Image illustrating sentinel lymph nodes. The axillary lymph nodes drain 75% of the lymph from the breasts and so may swell in cancer.

About 75% of lymph from the breasts drains into the axillary lymph nodes, making them important in the diagnosis and staging of breast cancer. A doctor will usually refer a patient to a surgeon to have an axillary lymph node dissection to see if the cancer cells have been trapped in the nodes. For clinical stages I and II breast cancer, axillary lymph node dissection should only be performed after first attempting sentinel node biopsy.

If cancer cells are found in the nodes, it increases the risk of metastatic breast cancer. Another method of determining breast cancer spread is to perform an endoscopic axillary sentinel node biopsy. This involves injecting a dye into the breast lump and seeing which node it first spread to (the sentinel node). This node is then removed and examined. If there is no cancer present, it is assumed the cancer has not spread to the other lymph nodes. This procedure is often less invasive and less damaging than the axillary lymph node dissection. The estimated risk of lymphedema following sentinel lymph node procedure is less than 3%. The approximate risk of lymphedema following axillary lymph node dissection is 10-15% and this can slightly increase with the addition of radiotherapy and chemotherapy to as much as 20-25% depending on the extent of dissection, extent of radiotherapy fields, and history of chemotherapy.

On CT scan or MRI, axillary lymphadenopathy can be defined as solid nodes measuring more than 1.5 cm without fatty hilum. Lymph nodes may be normal up to 3 cm if consisting largely of fat.

Axillary lymph nodes are included within the standard tangential fields in radiotherapy for breast cancer. In the case of comprehensive nodal irradiation, which includes axillary levels I, II, and III, as well as a supraclavicular lymph node field, there is a risk of damage to brachial plexus. The risk is estimated to be less than 5% as the brachial plexus radiation tolerance according to (Emami 1991) is 60 Gy in standard fractionation (2 Gy per fraction). A common prescribed dose for breast cancer with comprehensive nodal fields would be 50 Gy in 25 fractions with a boost planned to the lumpectomy cavity in the breast or scar on the chest wall if it is a mastectomy. If brachial plexopathy does occur, it is generally a late effect and may not manifest itself until 10 or 15 years later, and usually presents with slight painless muscular atrophy.

Malignancies in the gastrointestinal system like gastric cancer can metastasize to the left axillary lymph node which is called "Irish’s node".

== Additional images ==
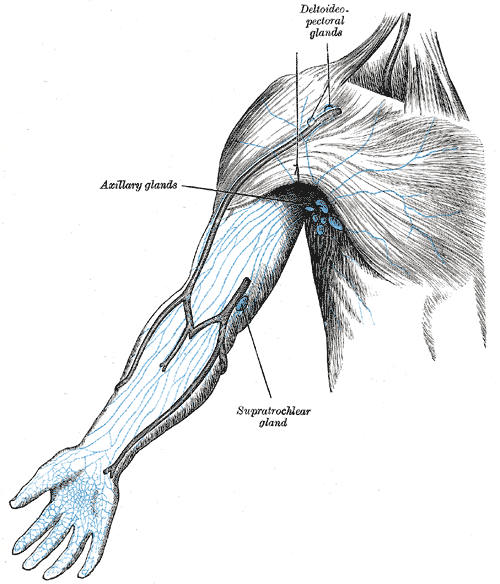
The superficial lymph glands and lymphatic vessels of the upper extremity

== See also ==
- Lymphatic system
- Rotter's lymph nodes
- Supraclavicular lymph nodes
