= Dermatopathic lymphadenopathy =

- Other names: Dermatopathic lymphadenitis
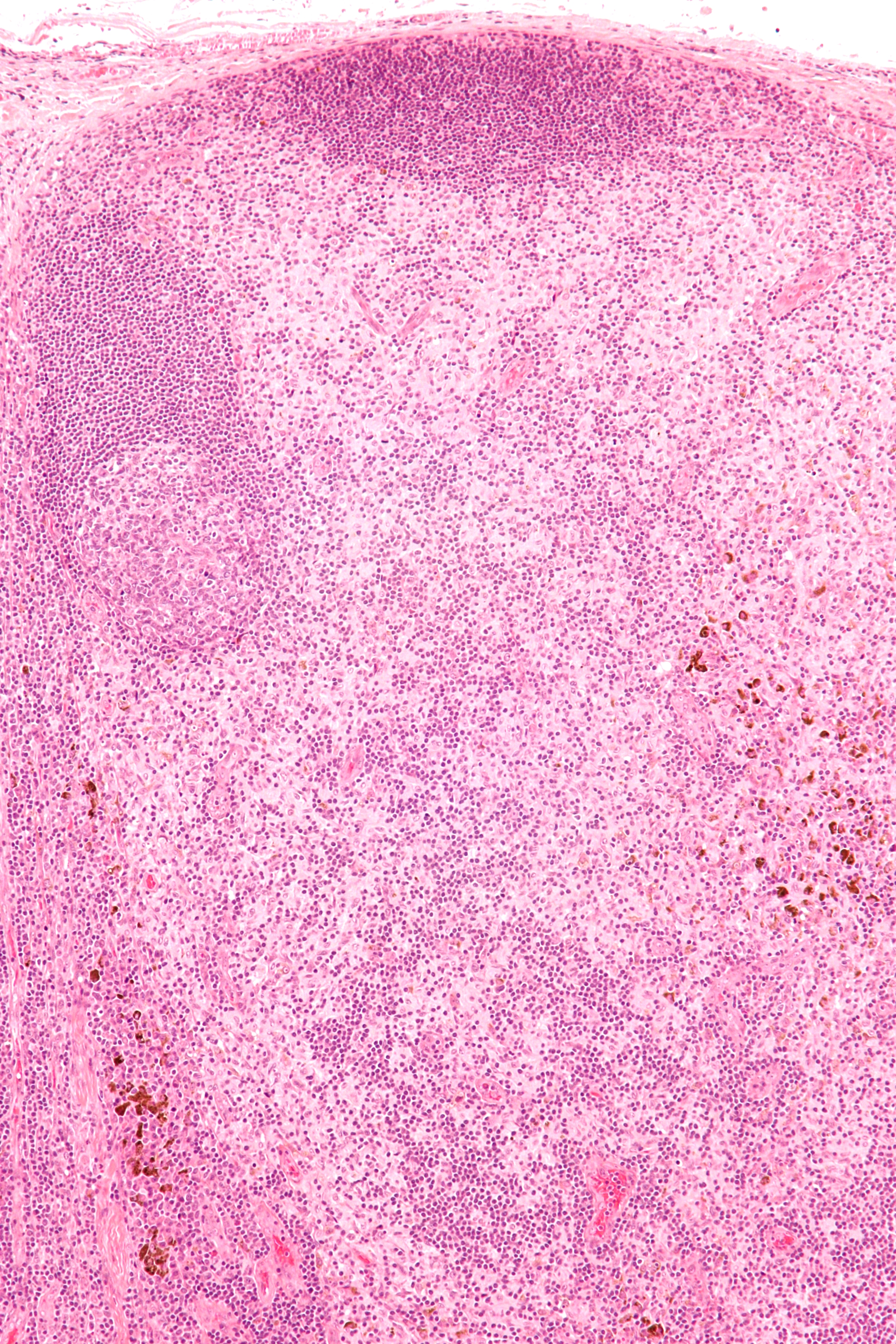
- Micrograph showing dermatopathic lymphadenopathy with the characteristic paracortical histiocytosis and melanin-laden macrophages. H&E stain.
- Specialty: Dermatology

In pathology, dermatopathic lymphadenopathy, is lymph node pathology due to skin disease.

== Cause ==
Also known as lipomelanotic reticulosis or Pautrier-Woringer disease, represents a rare form of benign lymphatic hyperplasia associated with most exfoliative or eczematoid inflammatory erythrodermas, including pemphigus, psoriasis, eczema, neurodermatitis, and atrophia senilis.

== Diagnosis ==
Dermatopathic lymphadenopathy is diagnosed by a lymph node biopsy. It has a characteristic pattern of histomorphology and immunohistochemical staining:

- Paracortical histiocytosis
- Melanin-laden macrophages
- Eosinophils
- Plasma cells (medulla of lymph node)

=== Differential diagnosis ===
- Cutaneous T cell lymphoma
- Hodgkin's lymphoma
- Melanoma

== Treatment ==
The treatment is based on the underlying cause.

== See also ==
- Skin disease
- List of cutaneous conditions
