= Brachial lymph nodes =

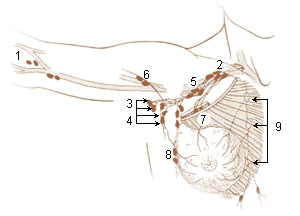
- Lymph nodes of the upper limb and breast

Details
- System: Lymphatic system
- Drains to: Central lymph nodes

Identifiers
- FMA: 44314

A brachial lymph nodes (or lateral group) are group of four to six lymph nodes which lies in relation to the medial and posterior aspects of the axillary vein; the afferents of these glands drain the whole arm with the exception of that portion whose vessels accompany the cephalic vein.

The efferent vessels pass partly to the central and subclavicular groups of axillary glands and partly to the inferior deep cervical glands.
