= Apical lymph nodes =

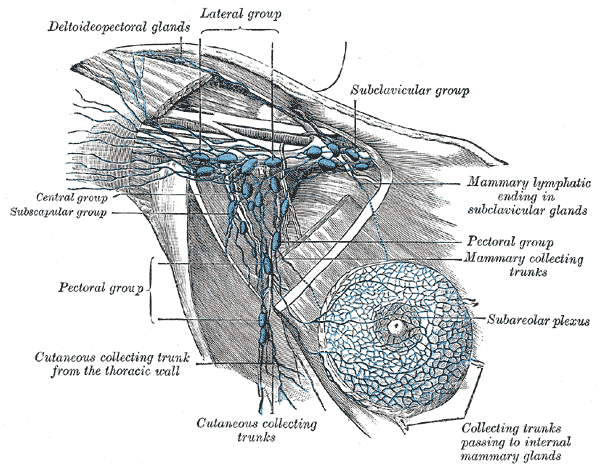
- Lymphatics of the mamma, and the axillary glands. (Subclavicular group labeled at upper right.)

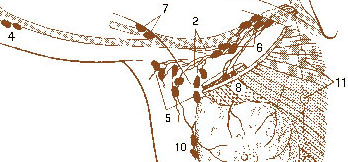
- 2. Axillary lymphatic plexus 4. Cubital lymph nodes (not part of the lymph node drainage of the breast); 5. Superficial axillary (low axillary); 6. Deep axillary lymph nodes 7. Brachial axillary lymph nodes 8. Interpectoral axillary lymph nodes (Rotter nodes); 10. Paramammary or intramammary lymph nodes 11. Parasternal lymph nodes (internal mammary nodes)

Details
- System: Lymphatic system
- Source: Central, deltopectoral
- Drains to: Subclavian trunk

Identifiers
- Latin: nodi lymphoidei axillares apicales
- TA98: A13.3.01.003
- TA2: 5237
- FMA: 14190 71742, 14190

An apical (or medial or subclavicular) group of six to twelve glands is situated partly posterior to the upper portion of the pectoralis minor and partly above the upper border of this muscle.

Its only direct territorial afferents are those that accompany the cephalic vein, and one that drains the upper peripheral part of the mamma. However, it receives the efferents of all the other axillary glands.

The efferent vessels of the subclavicular group unite to form the subclavian trunk, which opens either directly into the junction of the internal jugular and subclavian veins or into the jugular lymphatic trunk; on the left side it may end in the thoracic duct.

A few efferents from the subclavicular glands usually pass to the inferior deep cervical glands.

== Additional images ==
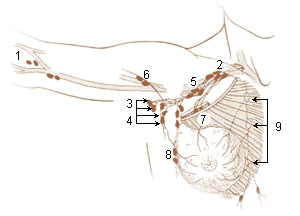
