= Deltopectoral lymph nodes =

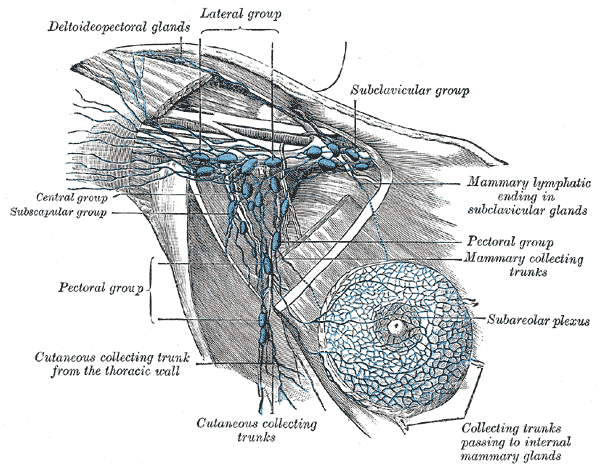
- Lymphatics of the mamma, and the axillary glands. (Deltoideopectoral glands labeled at upper left.)

- Regional lymph tissue. (Infraclavicular labeled at upper left.)

Details
- System: Lymphatic system
- Drains to: Apical lymph nodes

Identifiers
- Latin: nodi lymphoidei deltopectorales
- TA98: A13.3.01.009
- TA2: 5243
- FMA: 71752

One or two deltopectoral lymph nodes (or infraclavicular nodes) are found beside the cephalic vein, between the pectoralis major and deltoideus, immediately below the clavicle.

They are situated in the course of the external collecting trunks of the arm.

== Additional images ==
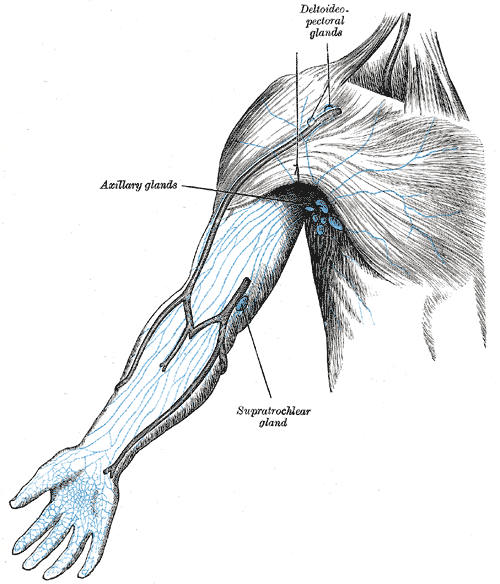
The superficial lymph glands and lymphatic vessels of the upper extremity.
