= Axillary lymphadenopathy =

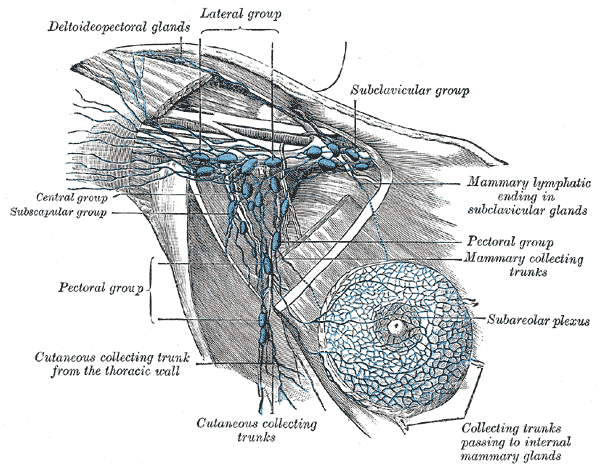
- Lymphatics of breast and the axillary glands

Axillary lymphadenopathy is distinguished by an increase in volume or changes in the morphology of the axillary lymph nodes. It can be detected through palpation during a physical examination or through changes in imaging tests. On a mammogram (MMG), normal lymph nodes typically appear oval or reniform with a radiolucent center representing hilar fat. The cortex is usually hypoechoic or even imperceptible on ultrasound imaging, whereas the medulla is hyperechoic. When a lymph node is damaged, whether by benign or malignant disease, it changes shape and structure, resulting in different patterns in imaging tests.

== Causes ==
Upper extremity infections or injuries are among the leading causes of axillary lymphadenopathy. Cat scratch disease, tularemia, and sporotrichosis are common infectious etiologies caused by inoculation and lymphatic drainage. The absence of an infectious source or injuries raises the possibility of a malignant cause such as Hodgkin or non-Hodgkin lymphoma. Cancers of the breast, lung, thyroid, stomach, colorectal, pancreatic, ovarian, kidney, and skin (melanoma) can spread to the axilla. Due to an inflammatory reaction to silicone particles from implant leakage, silicone breast implants may also cause axillary lymphadenopathy.

== Diagnosis ==
To diagnose this condition, scans or other imaging tests are used. Enlarged nodes in the vicinity of cancer areas could potentially contain cancer. Probable patients are observed for a few weeks until the cause of lymphadenopathy becomes obvious and they are instructed to return to the doctor if there is an increase in node size. Biopsy should be performed in case tests suggest malignancy.
