= Indium lung =

- Specialty: Pulmonology

Indium lung is a rare occupational lung disease caused by exposure to respirable indium in the form of indium tin oxide. It is classified as an interstitial lung disease (diffuse parenchymal lung disease). The indium industry is primarily based in Japan, where the majority of cases have been reported.

== Signs and symptoms ==
The major signs of indium lung are pulmonary alveolar proteinosis and pulmonary fibrosis. Symptoms include dyspnea (shortness of breath), cough, and increased sputum production. Hemoptysis has also been seen in people with indium lung. Other symptoms seen in some but not all cases include digital clubbing, low DLCO (capacity to move oxygen from the alveoli into the blood), and lowered forced expiratory volume. Emphysema has been associated with indium lung, but may not be part of the syndrome.

=== Complications ===
Lung cancer may be related to indium lung disease, though indium is not a known carcinogen.

== Causes ==
Indium lung is caused by exposure to indium tin oxide in a variety of occupational contexts, including reclamation and production. Exposure to indium tin oxide as it reacts can lead to exposure to indium metal, indium hydroxide, and indium oxide.

== Mechanism ==
The exact mechanism of pathogenesis is unknown, but it is hypothesized that indium may exacerbate existing autoimmune disorders or that phagocytosis of indium by alveolar macrophages may cause dysfunction in the macrophages.

== Diagnosis ==
CT scanning and radiography can be used to aid in the diagnosis of indium lung. CT abnormalities include ground-glass opacities, interlobular septal thickening, honeycombing, and bronchiectasis.

=== Laboratory findings ===
Multiple abnormal laboratory findings have been noted in indium lung. High levels of serum indium have been found in all cases of indium lung. Other abnormal laboratory values that have been found include elevated alanine aminotransferase, elevated aspartate aminotransferase, elevated C-reactive protein, elevated interstitial lung disease markers, and elevated GM-CSF autoantibodies.

== Prevention ==
The National Institute of Occupational Safety and Health, Japan (JNIOSH) set limits for acceptable exposure at 0.0003 mg/m^{3} after the discovery of indium lung. Methods for reducing indium exposure are thought to be the best mode of protection. Medical surveillance of indium workers is also a method of prevention.

== Treatment ==
There is no standardized treatment for indium lung disease. Treatment options include pulmonary lavage and corticosteroid therapy.

== Prognosis ==
Prognostic factors were a matter of research as of 2012, but preliminary evidence suggests that duration of employment and reported use of respiratory protection are not prognostic factors, but the serum level of indium may be a prognostic factor - higher levels of serum indium have been associated with worse prognoses. Indium lung disease has been fatal in several cases.

== History ==
It was first described by a group of Japanese researchers in 2003.

== Epidemiology ==
Cases have been reported in Japan, the United States, and China. The indium industry is mainly based in Japan, where the bulk of cases have occurred; indium industry is also present in the US, China, Taiwan, and South Korea. As of 2010, 10 cases had been described, though more than 100 indium workers had documented respiratory abnormalities.
