= Fuselage =

Main body of an aircraft

Fuselage of a Boeing 737 shown in brown

The fuselage (/ˈfjuːzəlɑːʒ/ or /-səl-/; from the French fuselé "spindle-shaped") is an aircraft's main body section. It holds the crew, passengers or cargo, and in single-engine aircraft usually the engine; in some amphibious aircraft the engine is instead mounted on a pylon above a fuselage that doubles as a floating hull. The fuselage also carries the wings, empennage and landing gear, holding the control and stabilizing surfaces in a fixed relationship to the lifting surfaces on which the aircraft's stability and control depend. It is one of the principal components of the airframe.

Fuselages have been built as fabric-covered trusses, as geodetic lattices, as monocoque shells and, in almost all metal aircraft since the 1930s, as semi-monocoque structures in which a thin skin is stiffened by frames and stringers. Large aircraft fuselages are manufactured as several separate sections, often by different companies, which are joined on the final assembly line. The Boeing 787 and Airbus A350 have fuselages of carbon-fibre-reinforced polymer.

== Types of structures ==
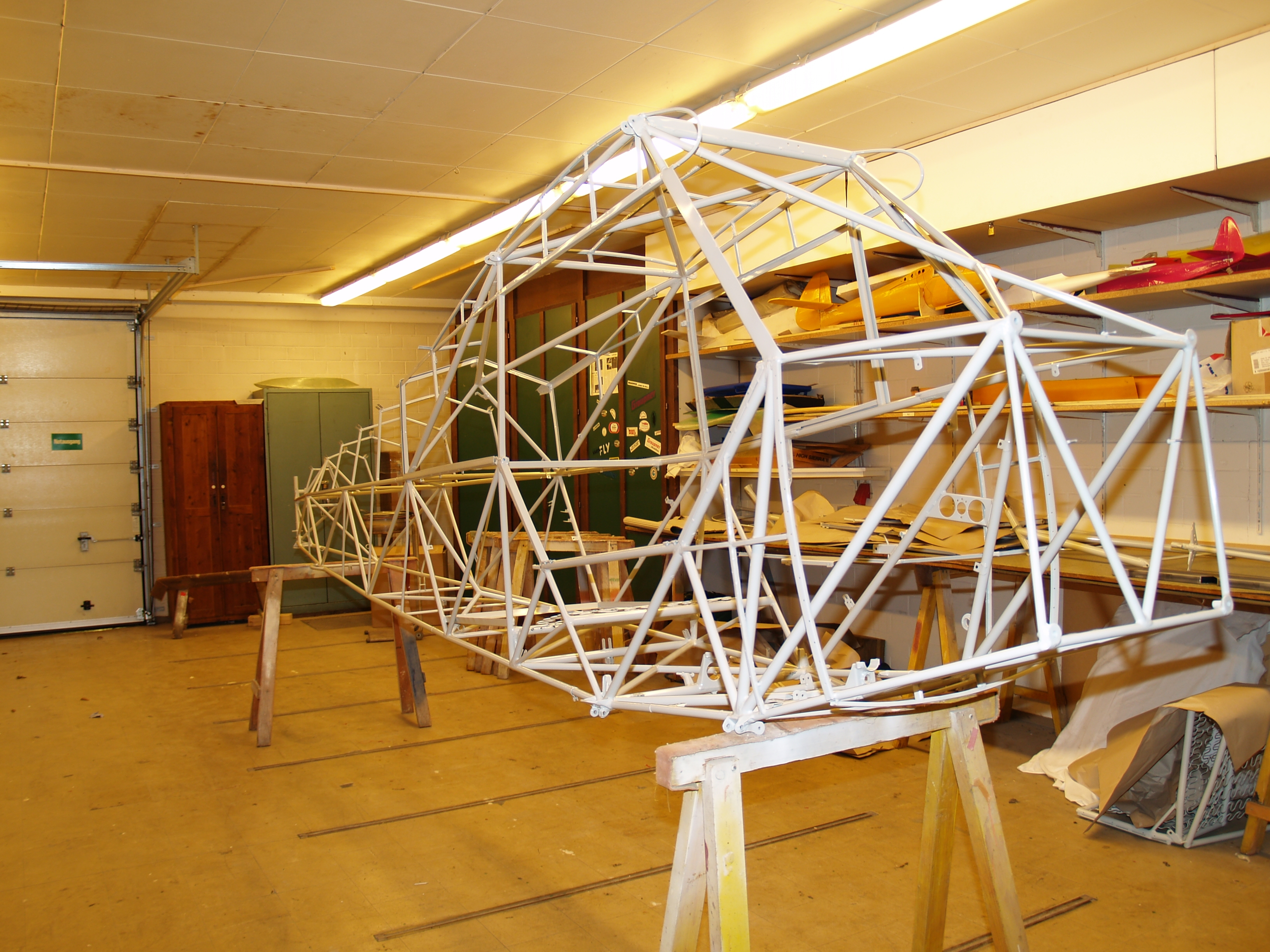
Piper PA-18 welded tube truss fuselage structure

=== Truss structure ===
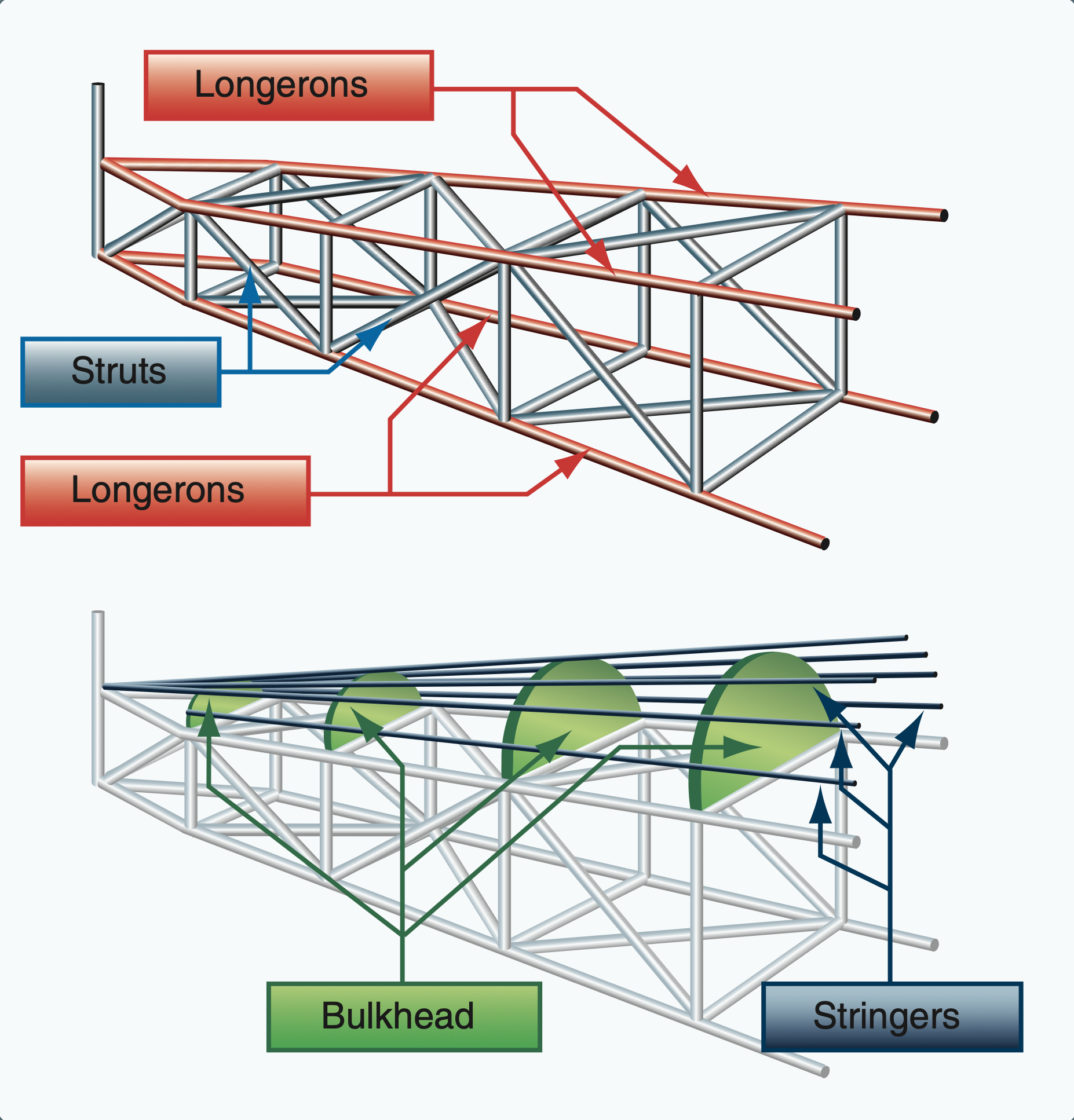
Some older types of aircraft design utilized open truss structure constructed of wood, steel, or aluminum tubing.

This type of structure is still in use in many lightweight aircraft using welded steel tube trusses. A box truss fuselage structure can also be built out of wood—often covered with plywood. Simple box structures may be rounded by the addition of supported lightweight stringers, allowing the fabric covering to form a more aerodynamic shape, or one more pleasing to the eye.

=== Geodesic construction ===
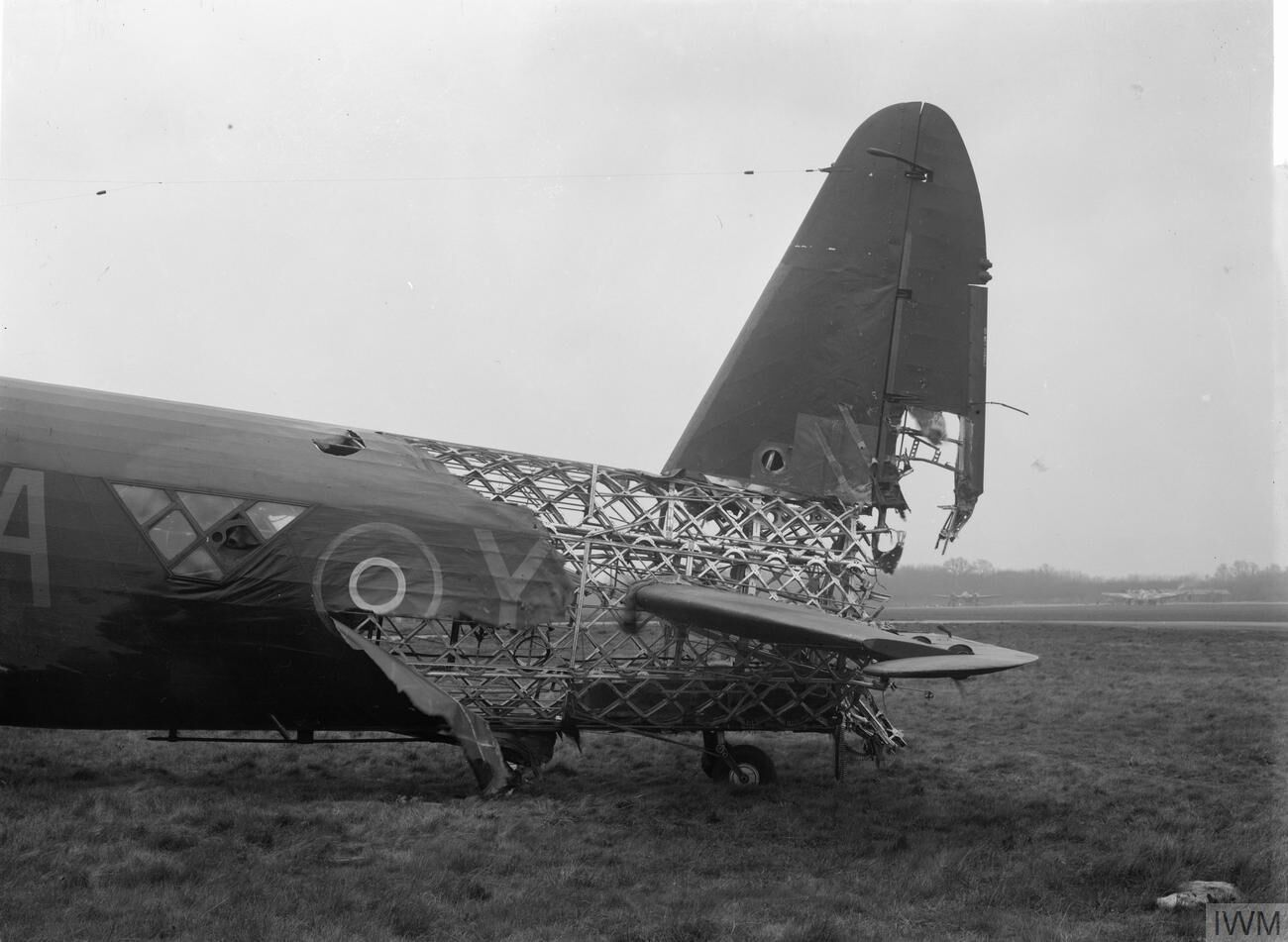
The geodetic airframe of a Vickers Wellington, visible as a result of damage sustained to the fuselage skin on the aircraft's tail

Geodesic (or geodetic) construction was developed by Barnes Wallis at Vickers-Armstrongs in the 1930s and used for the whole fuselage of the Vickers Wellesley and Vickers Wellington. The structure is a space frame of aluminium alloy members that spiral around the fuselage in opposite directions, so that each member is supported by those crossing it; a fabric covering completes the aerodynamic shell. Because the load paths are redundant, a geodetic fuselage can survive extensive local damage without collapse. The system was not carried forward after the war; stressed skin construction was lighter and simpler to produce.

=== Monocoque shell ===
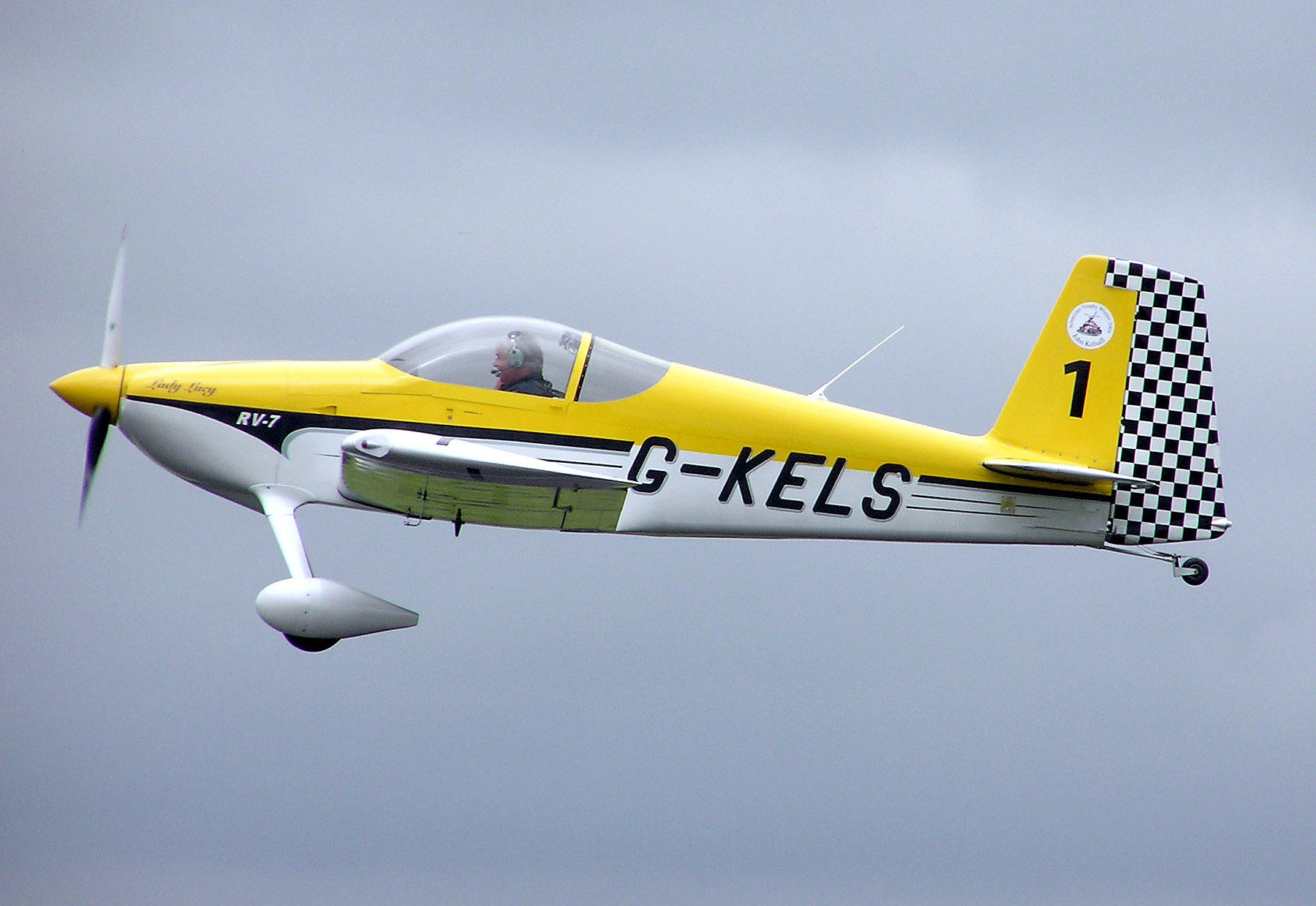
The Van's Aircraft RV-7 of semi-monocoque construction

In this method, the exterior surface of the fuselage is also the primary structure. A typical early form of this (see the Lockheed Vega) was built using molded plywood, where the layers of plywood are formed over a "plug" or within a mold. A later form of this structure uses fiberglass cloth impregnated with polyester or epoxy resin as the skin, instead of plywood. A simple form of this used in some amateur-built aircraft uses rigid expanded foam plastic as the core, with a fiberglass covering, eliminating the necessity of fabricating molds, but requiring more effort in finishing (see the Rutan VariEze). An example of a larger molded wooden aircraft is the de Havilland Mosquito fighter/light bomber of World War II, whose fuselage was a sandwich of balsa between plywood skins. No plywood-skin fuselage is truly monocoque, since stiffening elements are incorporated into the structure to carry concentrated loads that would otherwise buckle the thin skin.

Moulded fibreglass shells made in female ("negative") moulds, which give a near-finished outer surface, are standard in the series production of sailplanes and many light aircraft. Carbon-fibre construction of this type reached large airliners with the Boeing 787, whose fuselage is built as one-piece composite barrel sections with the stringers co-cured into the skin and the frames fastened to it afterwards; a single barrel eliminates 40,000–50,000 fasteners compared with a riveted aluminium section. The Airbus A350 instead uses carbon-fibre skin in the form of large curved panels, laid by automated fibre placement and then assembled onto frames.

=== Semi-monocoque ===
Monocoque and semi-monocoque design

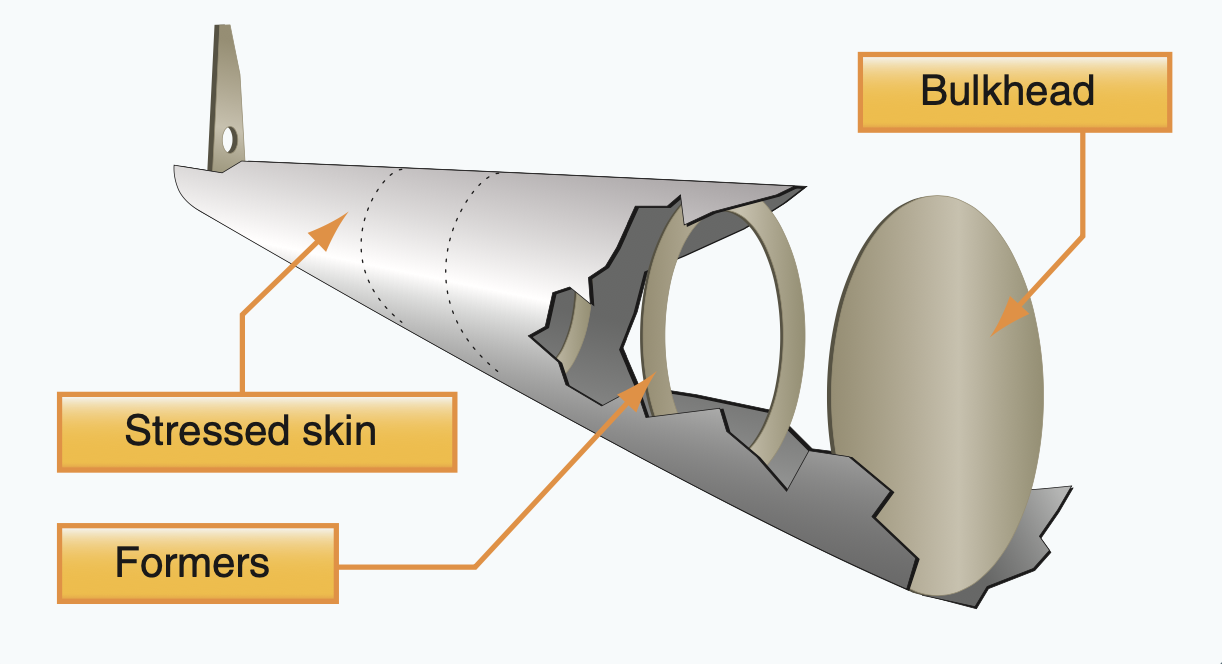
Monocoque construction uses stressed skin to support almost all loads much like an aluminum beverage can.

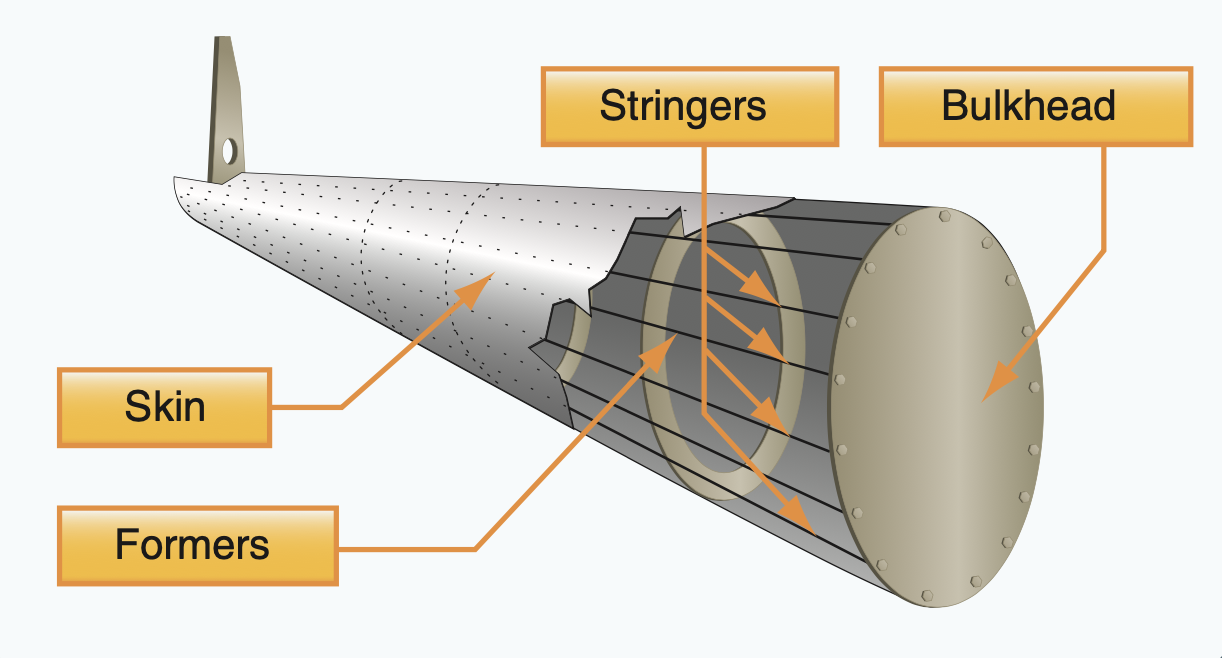
Semi-monocoque construction, partial or one-half, uses a substructure to which the airplane's skin is attached.

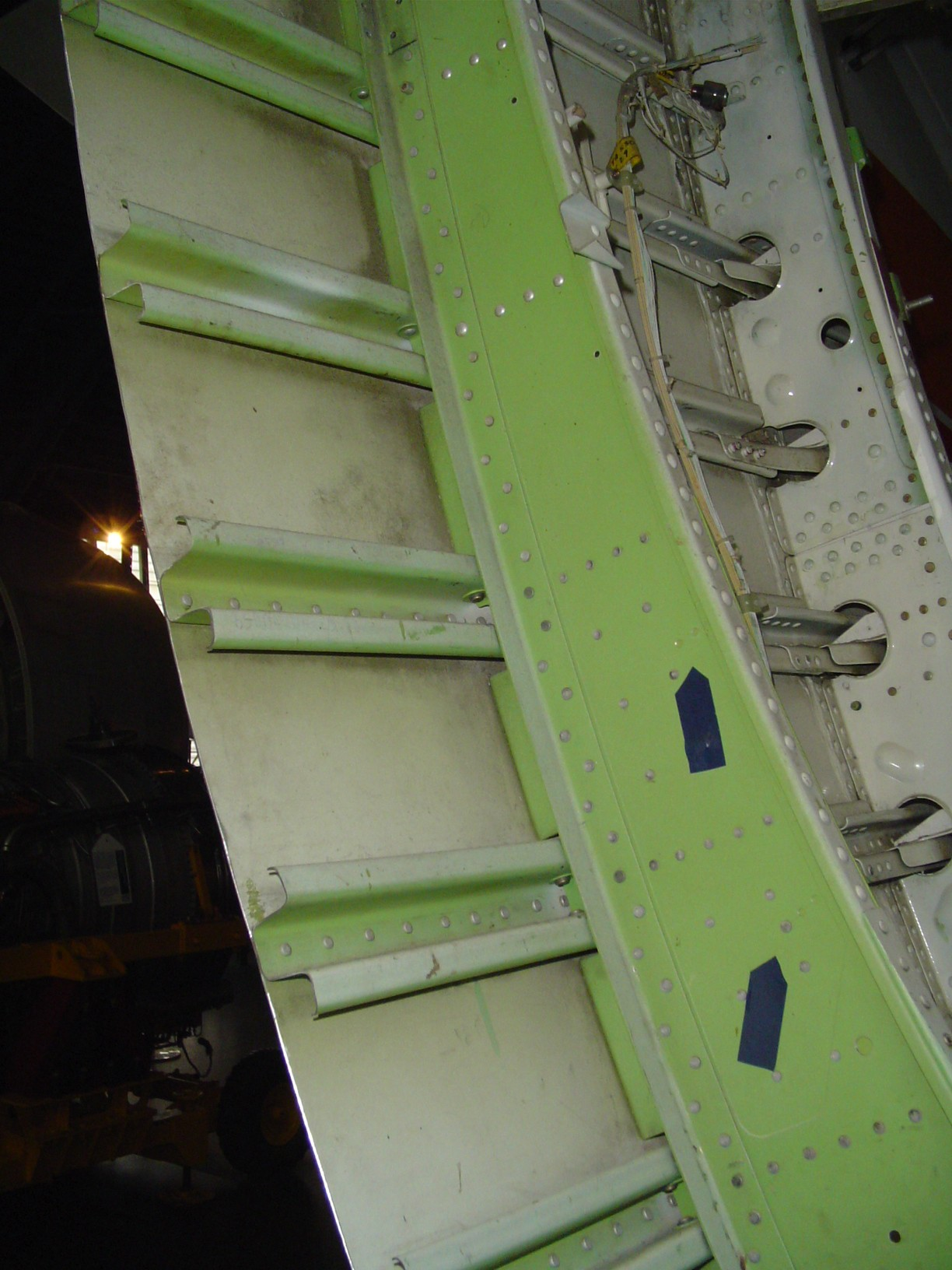
Sectioned fuselage of a Boeing 747 showing formers, stringers and skin all made of aluminium

This is the preferred method of constructing an all-aluminum fuselage. First, a series of formers in the shape of the fuselage cross sections are held in position on a rigid fixture. These formers are then joined with lightweight longitudinal elements called stringers. These are in turn covered with a skin of sheet aluminum, attached by riveting or by bonding with special adhesives. The fixture is then disassembled and removed from the completed fuselage shell, which is then fitted out with wiring, controls, and interior equipment such as seats and luggage bins. Large aircraft are built this way as several separate fuselage sections, each a complete barrel or set of panels with its frames and stringers, which are joined with fasteners at circumferential splice joints on the final assembly line. As the accuracy of the final product is determined largely by the costly fixture, this form is suitable for series production, where many identical aircraft are to be produced. Early examples of this type include the Douglas Aircraft DC-2 and DC-3 civil aircraft and the Boeing B-17 Flying Fortress. Most metal light aircraft are constructed using this process.

Both monocoque and semi-monocoque are referred to as "stressed skin" structures as all or a portion of the external load (i.e. from wings and empennage, and from discrete masses such as the engine) is taken by the surface covering. In addition, all the load from internal pressurization is carried (as skin tension) by the external skin.

The proportioning of loads between the components is a design choice dictated largely by the dimensions, strength, and elasticity of the components available for construction and whether or not a design is intended to be "self jigging", not requiring a complete fixture for alignment.

== Loads and pressurization ==
A fuselage is loaded as a beam, carrying bending and shear from the wing, tail and landing-gear reactions and from the masses inside it, and as a pressure vessel. In a stressed-skin fuselage the skin carries shear and the hoop and longitudinal tension from cabin pressurization, the stringers carry much of the bending, and the frames hold the cross-section shape and distribute concentrated loads. The pressurized cabin is closed at each end by a forward and an aft pressure bulkhead, and the pressurization cycle of each flight is a major source of fatigue loading in the fuselage; the de Havilland Comet losses of 1954 were traced to fatigue cracks growing from the corners of cut-outs in the pressurized skin. The 787's composite fuselage is designed for a higher cabin pressure and larger windows than earlier aluminium airliners.

== Materials ==
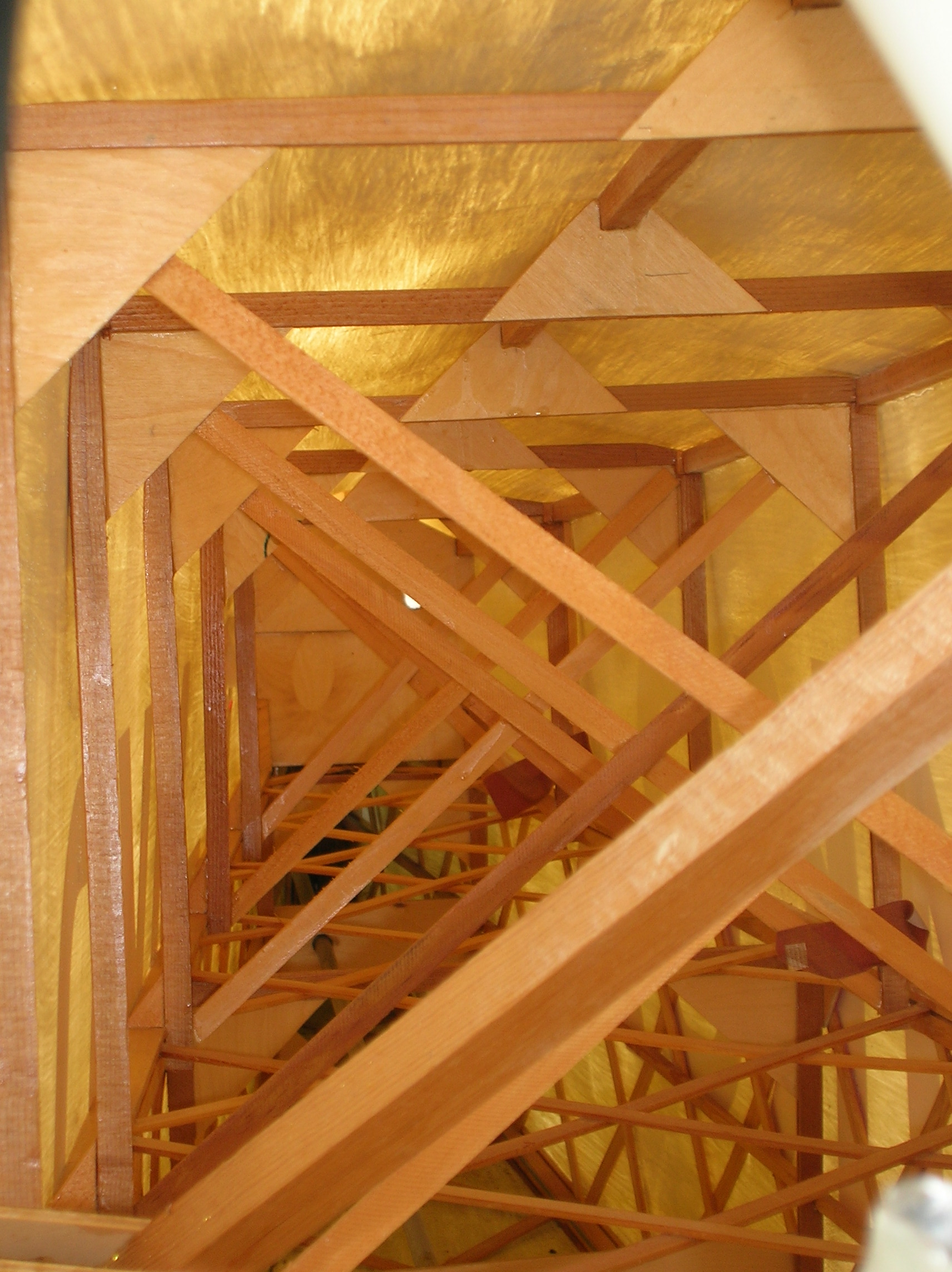
Inside view of the wooden, fabric-covered fuselage of a Fisher FP-202.

Early aircraft were constructed of wood frames covered in fabric. As monoplanes became popular, metal frames improved the strength, which eventually led to all-metal-structure aircraft, with metal covering for all its exterior surfaces - this was first pioneered in the second half of 1915. Metal fuselages are built mainly from high-strength aluminium alloys, with titanium alloys and steel used for heavily loaded frames, fittings and attachment points. Composites are now used for the fuselage primary structure of some large airliners; the Boeing 787 is about 50 per cent composite by structural weight overall and the Airbus A350 up to 54 per cent.

The shift from aluminium to composites across successive generations of airliners is shown in the table below, which gives the structural composition by mass of six types in order of first flight.

Airliner structural composition by mass
Material	B747	A300B4	B767	B757	B777	B787
Aluminium	81%	77%	80%	78%	70%	20%
Steel	13%	12%	14%	12%	11%	10%
Titanium	4%	4%	2%	6%	7%	15%
Composites	1%	4%	3%	3%	11%	50%
Other	1%	3%	1%	1%	1%	5%

== Manufacture ==
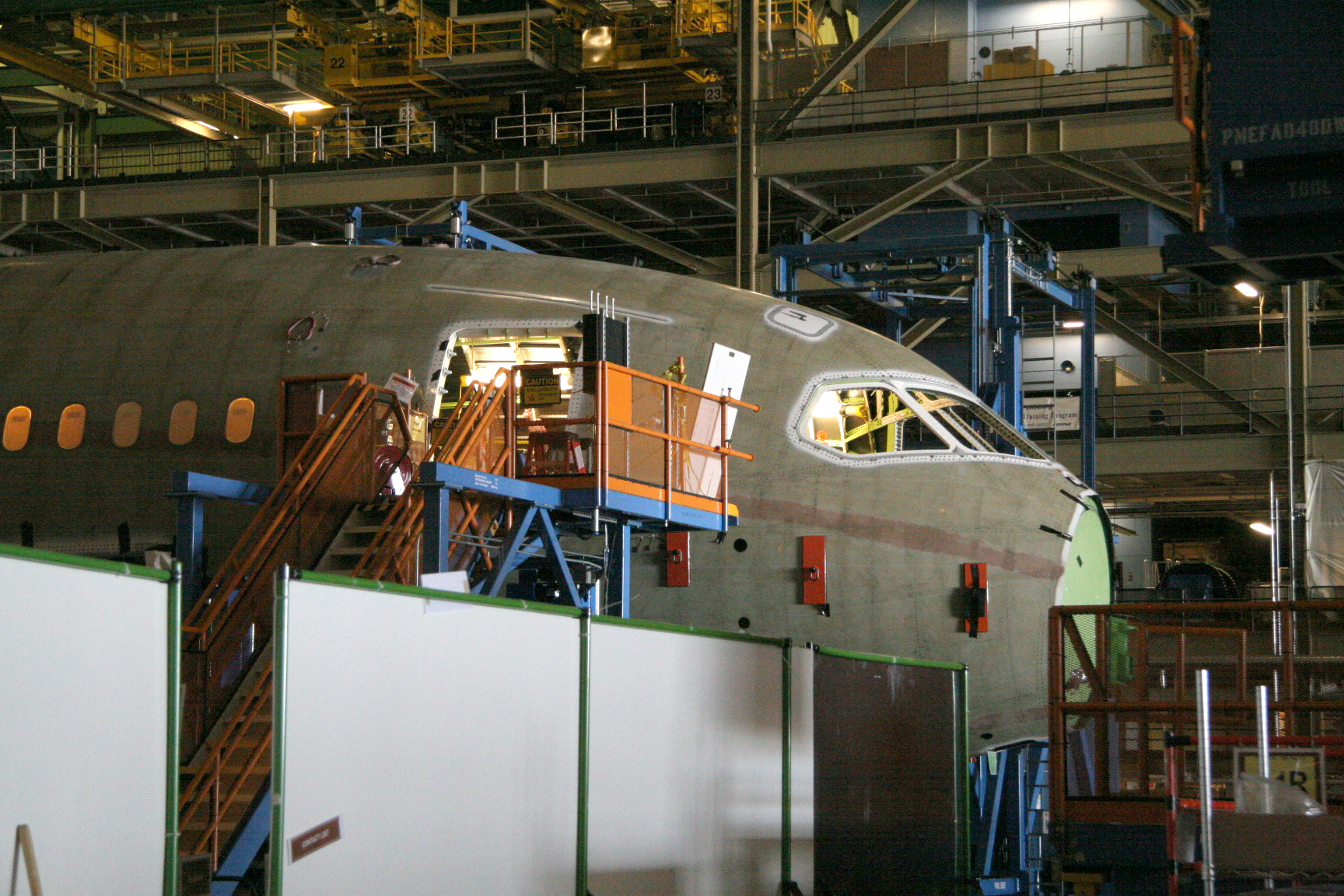
A Boeing 787 Section 41 forward fuselage at the Everett factory

Airliner fuselages are produced as sections, each built as an aerostructure by a separate plant and shipped to final assembly. On Boeing aircraft the nose and flight deck is Section 41; the 787's aft fuselage, for example, is Sections 47 and 48. The 787's sections are built in Wichita, Kansas (Spirit AeroSystems, a Boeing subsidiary since 2025), Japan (Kawasaki), Grottaglie, Italy (Leonardo) and North Charleston, South Carolina, a plant Boeing bought from Vought in 2009. Airbus builds A350 fuselage sections at Saint-Nazaire, France, Stade, Germany, and Kinston, North Carolina.

Sections may be delivered "equipped" or "stuffed", with floors, wiring, lighting, doors and landing gear installed and tested by the section supplier rather than on the final assembly line. Metal fuselage sections are assembled from formed skin panels, frames and stringers in jigs; composite sections are either built as complete barrels or laid up as large panels by automated fibre placement and cured in an autoclave.

Some more modern aircraft are assembled via Determinate Assembly.

== Windows ==
Cockpit windshields on the Airbus A320 must withstand bird strikes up to 350 kn (650 km/h) and are made of chemically strengthened glass. They are usually composed of three layers or plies, of glass or plastic : the inner two are 8 mm (0.3 in.) thick each and are structural, while the outer ply, about 3 mm thick, is a barrier against foreign object damage and abrasion, with often a hydrophobic coating. It must prevent fogging inside the cabin and de-ice from −50 °C (−58 °F). This was previously done with thin wires similar to a rear car window but is now accomplished with a transparent, nanometers-thick coating of indium tin oxide sitting between plies, electrically conductive and thus transmitting heat. Curved glass improves aerodynamics but sight criteria also needs larger panes. A cockpit windshield is composed of 4–6 panels, 35 kg (77 lb) each on an Airbus A320. In its lifetime, an average aircraft goes through three or four windshields, and the market is shared evenly between OEM and higher margins aftermarket.

Cabin windows, made from stretched acrylic glass, which is much lighter than glass, consist of multiple panes: an outer one built to support four times the maximum cabin pressure, an inner one for redundancy and a scratch pane near the passenger. Acrylic is susceptible to crazing: a network of fine cracks appears but can be polished to restore optical transparency, and uncoated windows are typically removed and polished every 2–3 years.

== Wing integration ==
"Flying wing" aircraft, such as the Northrop YB-49 Flying Wing and the Northrop B-2 Spirit bomber have no separate fuselage; instead what would be the fuselage is a thickened portion of the wing structure.

Conversely, there have been a small number of aircraft designs which have no separate wing, but use the fuselage to generate lift. Examples include National Aeronautics and Space Administration's experimental lifting body designs and the Vought XF5U-1 Flying Flapjack.

A blended wing body can be considered a mixture of the above. It carries the useful load in a fuselage producing lift. A modern example is Boeing X-48. One of the earliest aircraft using this design approach is Burnelli CBY-3, which fuselage was airfoil shaped to produce lift.

== Gallery ==
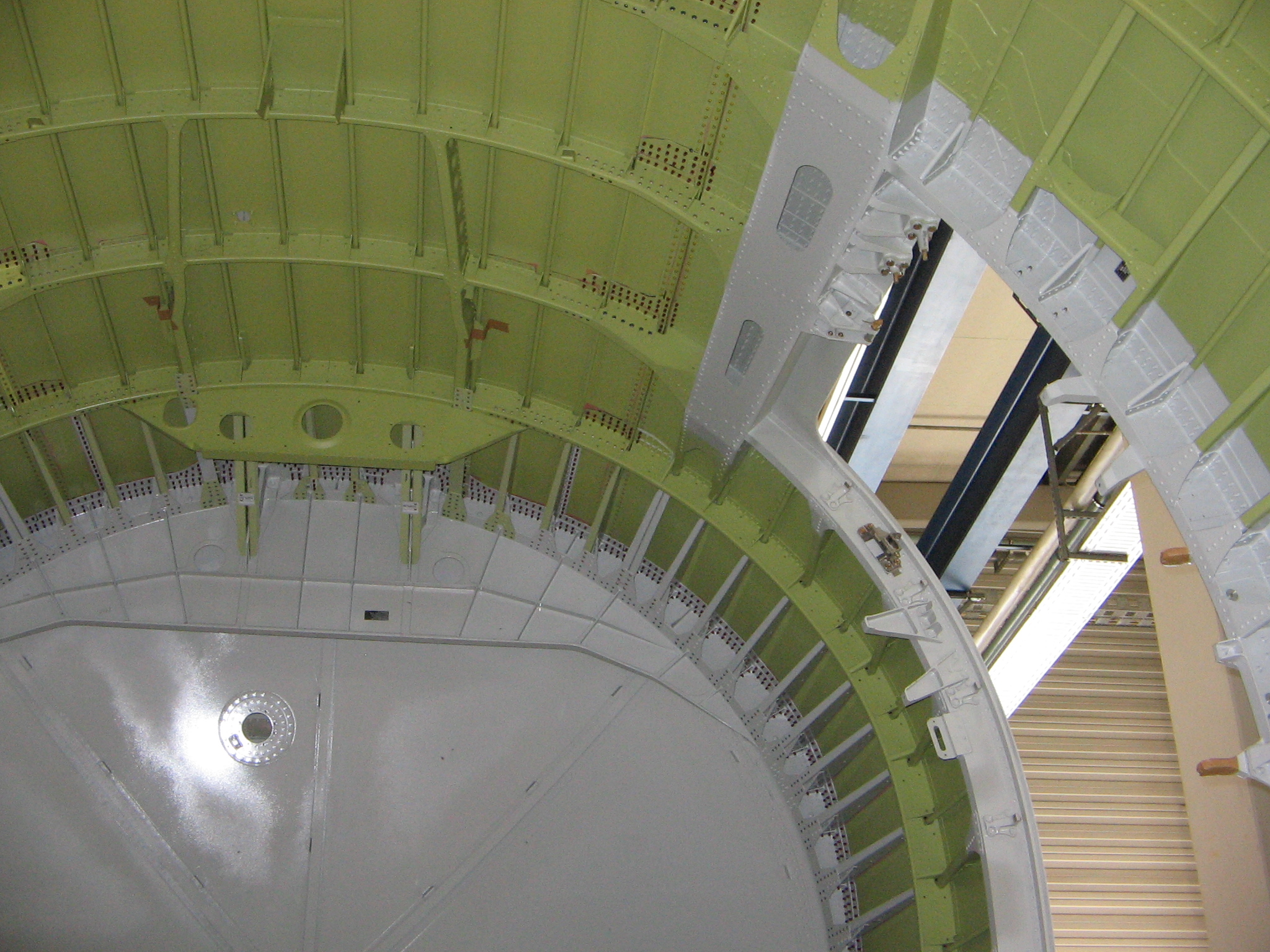
Interior rear-end of the main passenger level on an Airbus A340, showing the rear bulkhead as well as a doorway opening

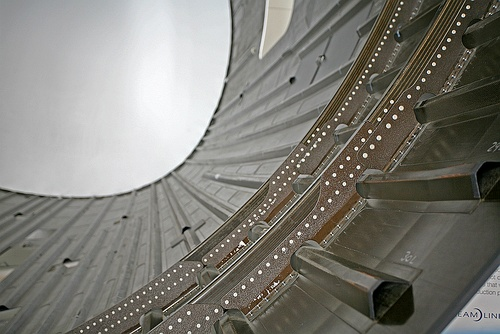
Inside a Boeing 787 carbon-fibre fuselage barrel, showing co-cured stringers and fastened frames

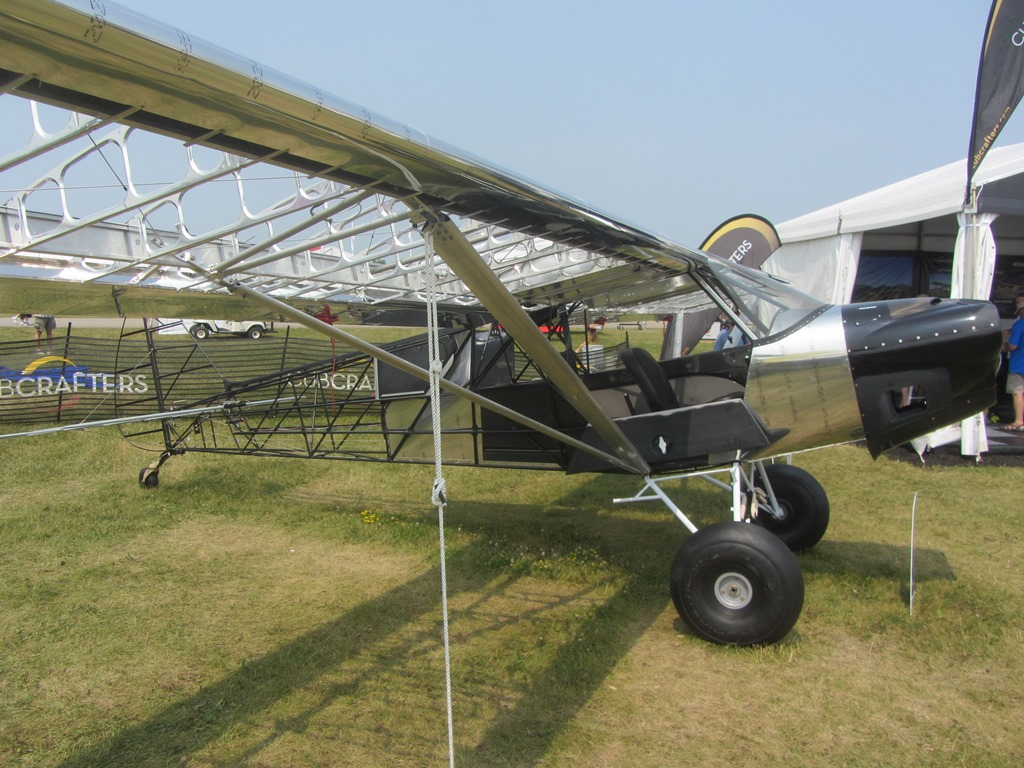
Fuselage of a CubCrafters Carbon Cub

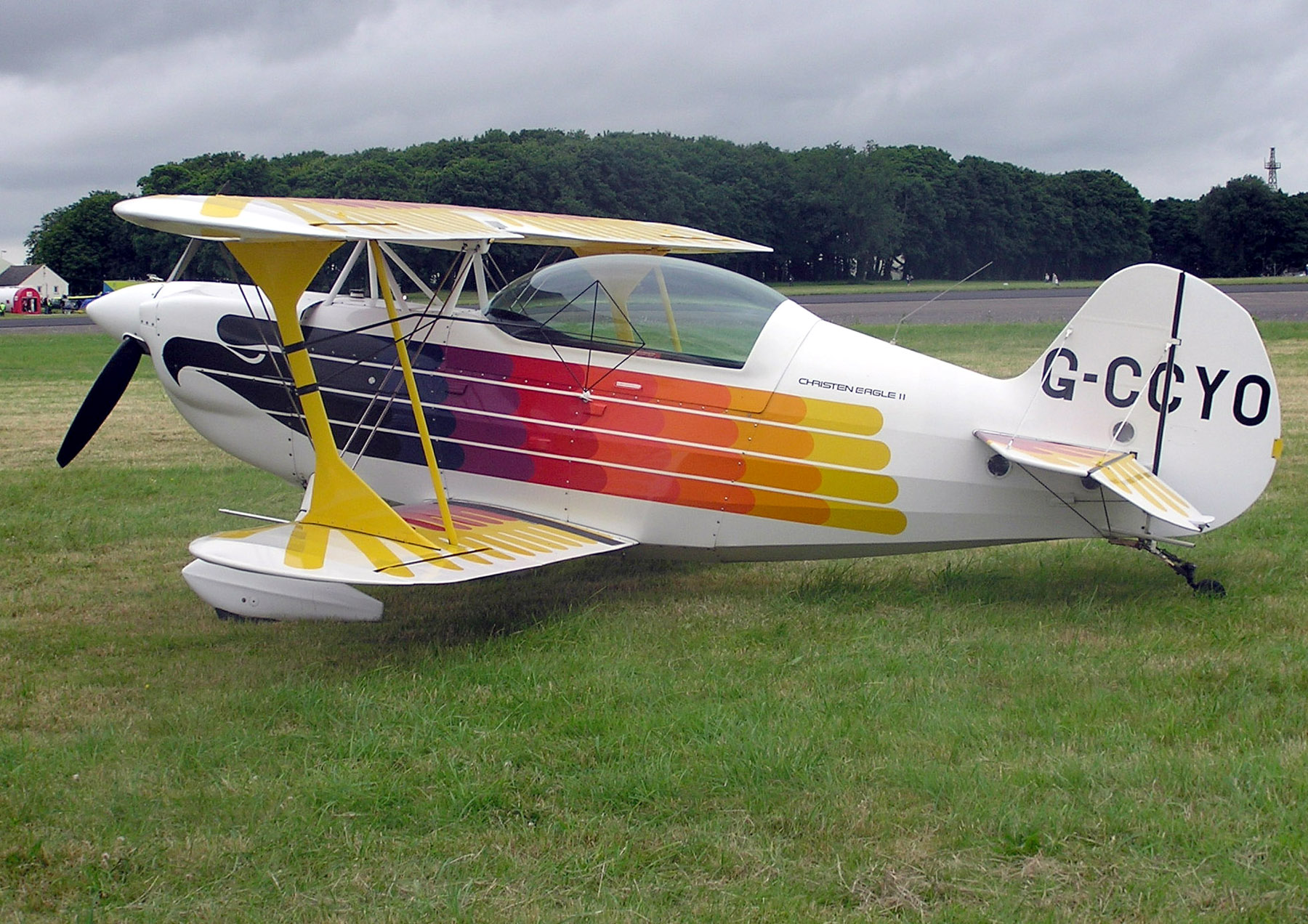
The fuselage can be short, and seemingly unaerodynamic, as in this Christen Eagle

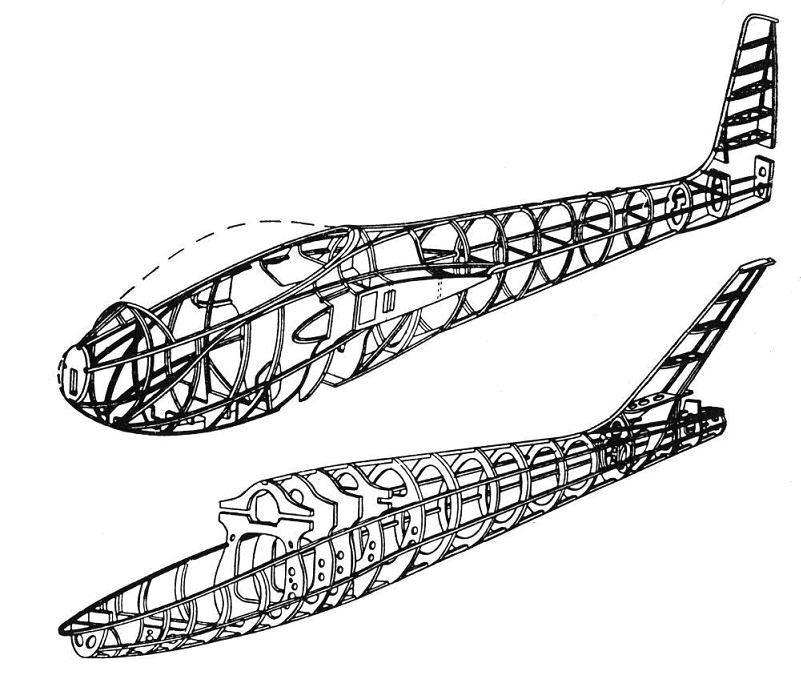
Glider fuselage schematic

== See also ==
- Aerostructure
- Airframe
- Aft pressure bulkhead
- Bulging factor
- Empennage
- Semi-monocoque
- Wing root
- Wing
