= Therapeutic irrigation =

- ICD-10-PCS: 3E1
- ICD-9-CM: 96.3-96.5
- MeSH: D007507

In medicine, therapeutic irrigation, or lavage (/ləˈvɑːʒ/ lə-VAHZH or /ˈlævɪdʒ/ LAV-ij), is cleaning or rinsing.

== Types ==
Specific types include:

- Antral lavage
- Antiseptic lavage
- Bronchoalveolar lavage
- Whole lung lavage
- Gastric lavage
- Peritoneal lavage
- Arthroscopic lavage
- Ductal lavage
- Nasal irrigation
- Ear lavage
- Pulsed lavage - delivery of an irrigant (usually normal saline) under direct pressure that is produced by an electrically powered device, useful in cleaning e.g. chronic wounds.
- Wound irrigation

== See also ==
- Douche
- Ear picking
- Enema
- Hematopoietic stem cell transplantation
- Life extension
- Regenerative medicine
- Teeth cleaning
