= Crazy paving (medicine) =

Medical sign on CT of the chest

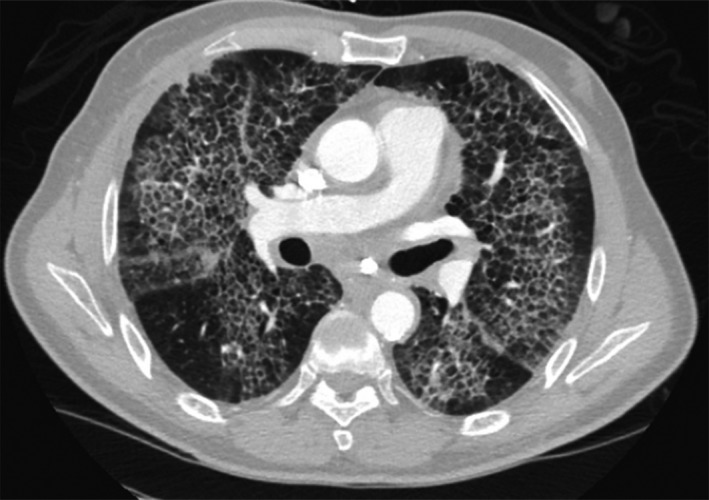
Chest CT scan showing crazy paving pattern

Crazy paving refers to a pattern seen on computed tomography of the chest, involving lobular septal thickening with variable alveolar filling. The finding is seen in pulmonary alveolar proteinosis, and other diseases. Its name comes from its resemblance to irregular paving stones, called crazy pavings.

== Causes ==
There are variety of causes for crazy paving patterns: infection, cancer, blood related disorders, diseases caused by inhalation of particles, and idiopathic disease. Specific lung disorders that can cause such patterns are: pneumocystis pneumonia, mucinous bronchioloalveolar carcinoma, pulmonary alveolar proteinosis, sarcoidosis, nonspecific interstitial pneumonia, organizing pneumonia, exogenous lipoid pneumonia, adult respiratory distress syndrome, and pulmonary hemorrhage syndromes.
