= Bulging factor =

Number used in aerospace design

Bulging factor is an engineering term describing the geometry of out-of plane deformations of the surface of a crack on a pressurized fuselage structure. It is used in evaluating the damage tolerance of airframe fuselages.

The single curved geometry and pressure differential causes a longitudinal crack to bulge out or protrude from the original shape. This change in geometry, or “bulging effect”, significantly increases the stress intensity factor at the crack tips. The effects of this loading condition can trigger different types of failure mechanisms.

For the case of unstiffened shell structures, the bulging factor can be defined as the ratio of stress-intensity (SIF) of a curved shell to the stress-intensity factor of a flat panel:

$bulging factor = SIF(curved)/SIF(flat)$

The representation of this phenomenon becomes rather complex due to the biaxial and internal pressure load and structural configuration.
