= Indium tin oxide =

Chemical compound

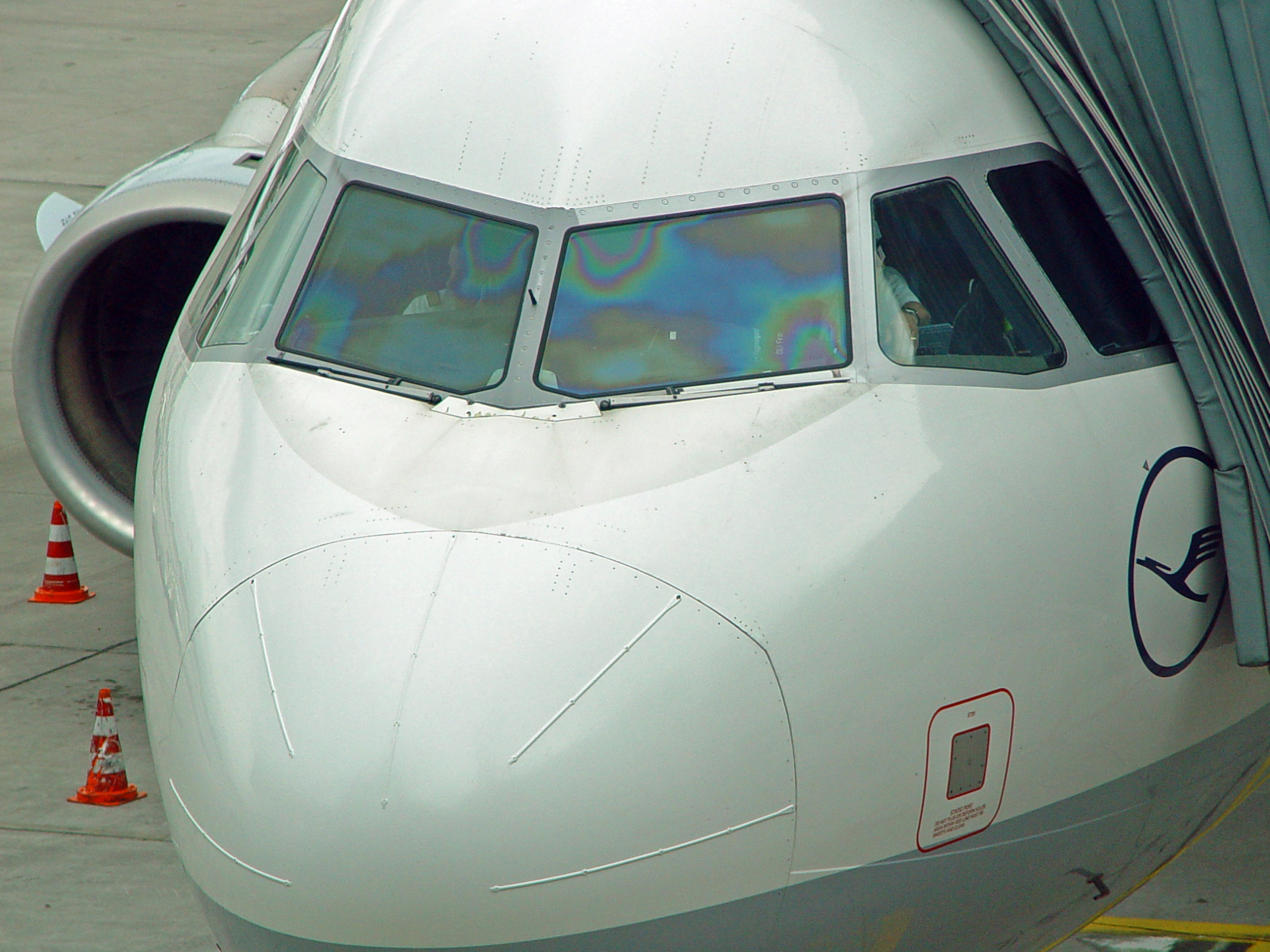
Thin film interference caused by ITO coating on an Airbus cockpit window, used for defrosting.

Indium tin oxide (ITO) is a ternary composition of indium, tin and oxygen in varying proportions. Depending on the oxygen content, it can be described as either a ceramic or an alloy. Indium tin oxide is typically encountered as an oxygen-saturated composition with a formulation of 74% In, 8% Sn, and 18% O by weight. Oxygen-saturated compositions are so typical that unsaturated compositions are termed oxygen-deficient ITO. It is transparent and colorless in thin layers, while in bulk form it is yellowish to gray. Thin-film ITO deposited for use in the infrared can act as a dichroic mirror.

Indium tin oxide is one of the most widely used transparent conducting oxides, not just for its electrical conductivity and optical transparency, but also for the ease with which it can be deposited as a thin film, as well as its chemical resistance to moisture. As with all transparent conducting films, a compromise must be made between conductivity and transparency, since increasing the thickness and increasing the concentration of charge carriers increases the film's conductivity, but decreases its transparency.

Thin films of indium tin oxide are most commonly deposited on surfaces by physical vapor deposition. Often used is electron beam evaporation, or a range of sputter deposition techniques.

== Material and properties ==
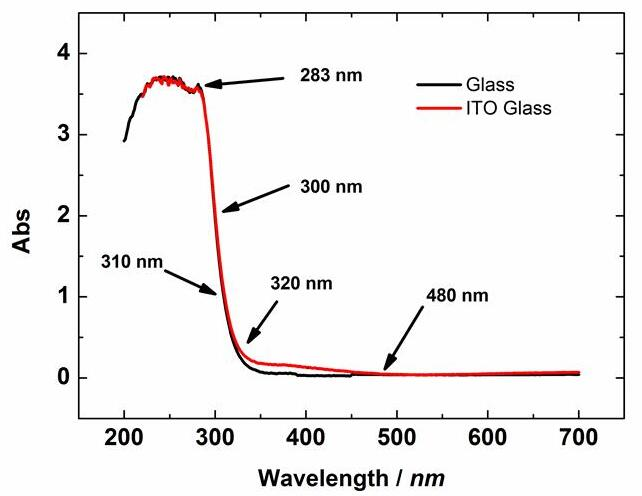
Absorption of glass and ITO glass.

ITO is a mixed oxide of indium and tin with a melting point in the range 1526–1926 °C (1800–2200 K, 2800–3500 °F), depending on composition. The most commonly used material is an oxide of a composition of ca. In_{4}Sn. The material is a n-type semiconductor with a large bandgap of around 4 eV. ITO is both transparent to visible light and relatively conductive. It has a low electrical resistivity of ~10^{−4} Ω·cm, and a thin film can have an optical transmittance of greater than 80%. These properties are utilized to great advantage in touch-screen applications such as mobile phones.

== Common uses ==
Indium tin oxide (ITO) is an optoelectronic material that is applied widely in both research and industry. ITO can be used for many applications, such as flat-panel displays, smart windows, polymer-based electronics, thin film photovoltaics, glass doors of supermarket freezers, and architectural windows. Moreover, ITO thin films for glass substrates can be helpful for glass windows to conserve energy.

ITO green tapes are utilized for the production of lamps that are electroluminescent, functional, and fully flexible. Also, ITO thin films are used primarily to serve as coatings that are anti-reflective and for liquid crystal displays (LCDs) and electroluminescence, where the thin films are used as conducting, transparent electrodes.

ITO is often used to make transparent conductive coating for displays such as liquid crystal displays, OLED displays, plasma displays, touch panels, and electronic ink applications. Thin films of ITO are also used in organic light-emitting diodes, solar cells, antistatic coatings and EMI shieldings. In organic light-emitting diodes, ITO is used as the anode (hole injection layer).

ITO films deposited on windshields are used for defrosting aircraft windshields. The heat is generated by applying a voltage across the film. ITO is also used to reflect or absorb electromagnetic radiation. The F-22 Raptor's canopy has an ITO coating that absorbs radar waves and reflects infrared waves, enhancing its stealth capabilities and giving it a distinctive gold tint.

ITO is also used for various optical coatings, most notably infrared-reflecting coatings (hot mirrors) for automotive, and sodium vapor lamp glasses. Other uses include gas sensors, antireflection coatings, electrowetting on dielectrics, and Bragg reflectors for VCSEL lasers. ITO is also used as the IR reflector for low-e window panes. ITO was also used as a sensor coating in the later Kodak DCS cameras, starting with the Kodak DCS 520, as a means of increasing blue channel response.

ITO thin film strain gauges can operate at temperatures up to 1400 °C and can be used in harsh environments, such as gas turbines, jet engines, and rocket engines.

ITO is used as a transparent conductive layer in solar cells, including thin-film, perovskite, and tandem cells. Its transparency allows sunlight to reach the active layers, while its conductivity enables efficient charge collection, improving overall efficiency.

=== Silver doping ===
ITO has been popularly used as a high-quality flexible substrate to produce flexible electronics. However, this substrate's flexibility decreases as electrical conductivity improves. Previous research have indicated that the mechanical properties of ITO can be improved through increasing the degree of crystallinity. Doping with silver (Ag) can improve this property, but results in a loss of transparency. An improved doping method that uses silver nanoparticles (AgNPs) to create a hybrid ITO has proven to be effective in compensating for the decrease in transparency. The hybrid ITO consists of domains in one orientation grown on the AgNPs and a matrix of the other orientation. The domains are stronger than the matrix and function as barriers to crack propagation, significantly increasing the flexibility. The change in resistivity with increased bending significantly decreases in the hybrid ITO compared with homogeneous ITO.

== Alternative synthesis methods ==
ITO is typically deposited through expensive and energy-intensive processes that deal with physical vapor deposition (PVD). Such processes include sputtering, which results in the formation of brittle layers. Because of the cost and energy of physical vapor deposition, with the required vacuum processing, alternative methods of preparing ITO are being investigated.

=== Tape casting process ===
An alternative process that uses a particle-based technique, is known as the tape casting process. Because it is a particle-based technique, the ITO nano-particles are dispersed first, then placed in organic solvents for stability. Benzyl phthalate plasticizer and polyvinyl butyral binder have been shown to be helpful in preparing nanoparticle slurries. Once the tape casting process has been carried out, the characterization of the green ITO tapes showed that optimal transmission went up to about 75%, with a lower bound on the electrical resistance of 2 Ω·cm.

=== Laser sintering ===
Using ITO nanoparticles imposes a limit on the choice of substrate, owing to the high temperature required for sintering. As an alternative starting material, In-Sn alloy nanoparticles allow for a more diverse range of possible substrates. A continuous conductive In-Sn alloy film is formed firstly, followed by oxidation to bring transparency. This two step process involves thermal annealing, which requires special atmosphere control and increased processing time. Because metal nanoparticles can be converted easily into a conductive metal film under the treatment of laser, laser sintering is applied to achieve products' homogeneous morphology. Laser sintering is also easy and less costly to use since it can be performed in air.

=== Ambient gas conditions ===
For example, using conventional methods but varying the ambient gas conditions to improve the optoelectronic properties as, for example, oxygen plays a major role in the properties of ITO.

=== Chemical shaving for very thin films ===
There has been numerical modeling of plasmonic metallic nanostructures have shown great potential as a method of light management in thin-film nanodisc-patterned hydrogenated amorphous silicon (a-Si:H) solar photovoltaic (PV) cells. A problem that arises for plasmonic-enhanced PV devices is the requirement for 'ultra-thin' transparent conducting oxides (TCOs) with high transmittance and low enough resistivity to be used as device top contacts/electrodes. Unfortunately, most work on TCOs is on relatively thick layers and the few reported cases of thin TCO showed a marked decrease in conductivity. To overcome this it is possible to first grow a thick layer and then chemically shave it down to obtain a thin layer that is whole and highly conductive.

== Constraints and trade-offs ==
A major concern with ITO is cost. ITO costs several times more than aluminum-based alternatives such as AZO. AZO is a common choice of transparent conducting oxide (TCO) because of its lower cost and relatively good optical transmission performance in the solar spectrum. However, ITO is superior to AZO in many other important performance categories including chemical resistance to moisture. ITO is not affected by moisture, and is stable as part of copper indium gallium selenide solar cell for 25–30 years on a rooftop.

While the sputtering target or evaporative material that is used to deposit the ITO is significantly more costly than AZO, the amount of material placed on each cell is quite small. Therefore, the cost penalty per cell is quite small, too.

== Benefits ==
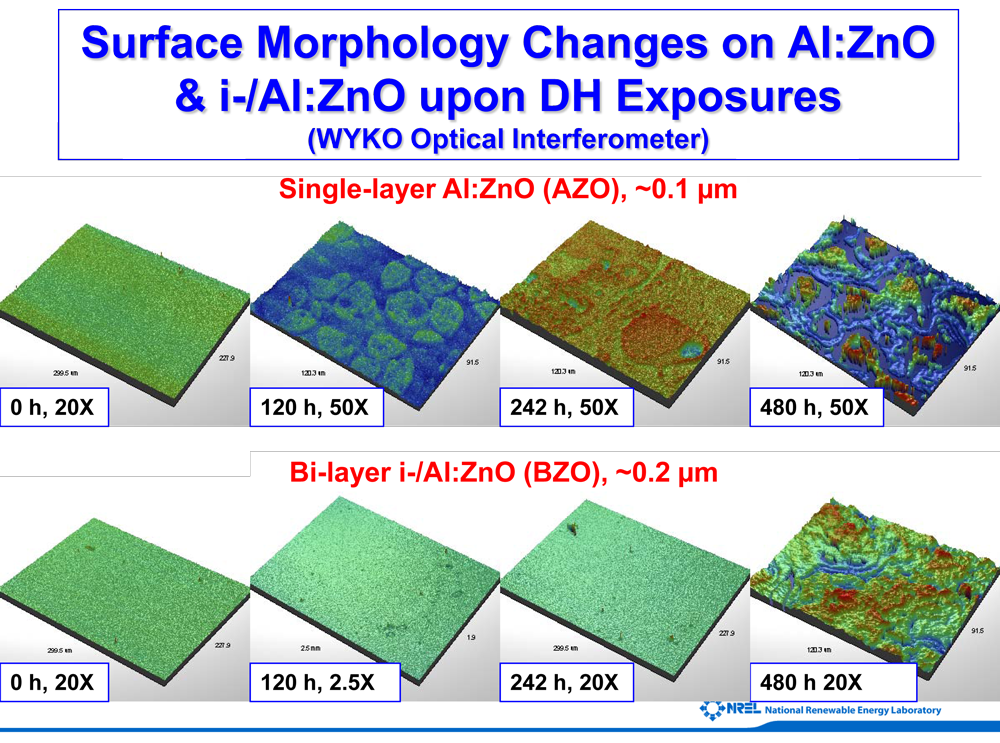
Surface morphology changes in Al:ZnO and i-/Al:ZnO upon damp heat (DH) exposure (optical interferometry)

The primary advantage of ITO compared to AZO as a transparent conductor for LCDs is that ITO can be precisely etched into fine patterns. AZO cannot be etched as precisely: It is so sensitive to acid that it tends to get over-etched by an acid treatment.

Another benefit of ITO compared to AZO is that if moisture does penetrate, ITO will degrade less than AZO.

The role of ITO glass as a cell culture substrate can be extended easily, which opens up new opportunities for studies on growing cells involving electron microscopy and correlative light.

== Research examples ==
ITO can be used in nanotechnology to provide a path to a new generation of solar cells. Solar cells made with these devices have the potential to provide low-cost, ultra-lightweight, and flexible cells with a wide range of applications. Because of the nanoscale dimensions of the nanorods, quantum-size effects influence their optical properties. By tailoring the size of the rods, they can be made to absorb light within a specific narrow band of colors. By stacking several cells with different sized rods, a broad range of wavelengths across the solar spectrum can be collected and converted to energy. Moreover, the nanoscale volume of the rods leads to a significant reduction in the amount of semiconductor material needed compared to a conventional cell. Recent studies demonstrated that nanostructured ITO can behave as a miniaturized photocapacitor, combining in a unique material the absorption and storage of light energy.

== Health and safety ==
Inhalation of indium tin oxide may cause mild irritation to the respiratory tracts and should be avoided. If exposure is long-term, symptoms may become chronic and result in benign pneumoconiosis. Studies with animals indicate that indium tin oxide is toxic when ingested, along with negative effects on the kidney, lung, and heart.

During the process of mining, production and reclamation, workers are potentially exposed to indium, especially in countries such as China, Japan, the Republic of Korea, and Canada and face the possibility of pulmonary alveolar proteinosis, pulmonary fibrosis, emphysema, and granulomas. Workers in the US, China, and Japan have been diagnosed with cholesterol clefts under indium exposure. Silver nanoparticles existed in improved ITOs have been found in vitro to penetrate through both intact and breached skin into the epidermal layer. Un-sintered ITOs are suspected of induce T-cell-mediated sensitization: on an intradermal exposure study, a concentration of 5% uITO resulted in lymphocyte proliferation in mice including the number increase of cells through a 10-day period.

A new occupational problem called indium lung disease was developed through contact with indium-containing dusts. The first patient is a worker associated with wet surface grinding of ITO who suffered from interstitial pneumonia: his lung was filled with ITO related particles. These particles can also induce cytokine production and macrophage dysfunction. Sintered ITOs particles alone can cause phagocytic dysfunction but not cytokine release in macrophage cells; however, they can intrigue a pro-inflammatory cytokine response in pulmonary epithelial cells. Unlike uITO, they can also bring endotoxin to workers handling the wet process if in contact with endotoxin-containing liquids. This can be attributed to the fact that sITOs have larger diameter and smaller surface area, and that this change after the sintering process can cause cytotoxicity.

Because of these issues, alternatives to ITO have been found.

== Recycling ==
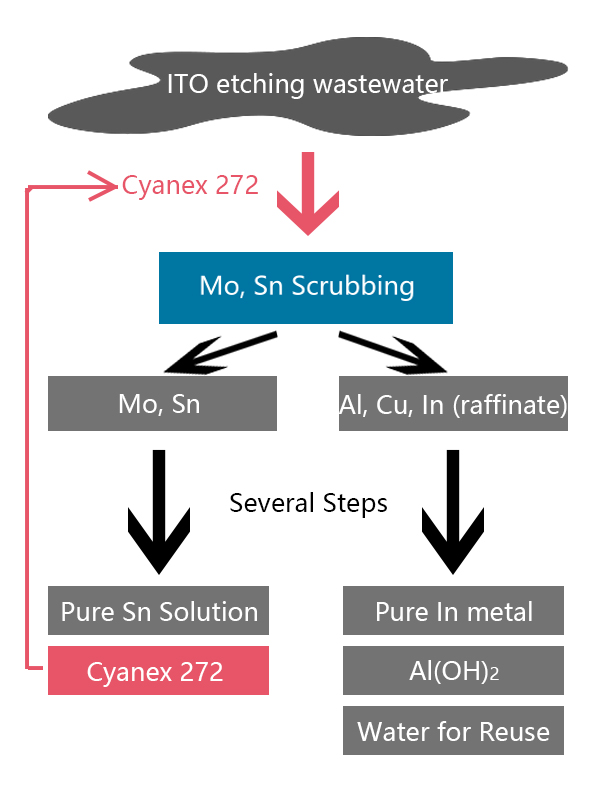
Process of indium-tin-oxide (ITO) etching wastewater treatment

The etching water used in the process of sintering ITO can only be used for a limited numbers of times before it has to be disposed. After degradation, the waste water should still contain valuable metals such as In and Cu as a secondary resource as well as Mo, Cu, Al, Sn and In, which can pose a health hazard to human beings.

== Alternative materials ==
Because of high cost and limited supply of indium, the fragility and lack of flexibility of ITO layers, and the costly layer deposition requiring vacuum, alternative materials are being investigated. Promising alternatives based on zinc oxide doped with various elements.

=== Doped compounds ===
Promising alternatives based on zinc oxide doped with various elements.

Several transition metal dopants in indium oxide, particularly molybdenum, give much higher electron mobility and conductivity than obtained with tin. Doped binary compounds such as aluminium-doped zinc oxide (AZO) and indium-doped cadmium oxide have been proposed as alternative materials. Other inorganic alternatives include aluminium, gallium or indium-doped zinc oxide (AZO, GZO or IZO).

=== Carbon nanotubes ===
Carbon nanotube conductive coatings are a prospective replacement.

=== Graphene ===
As another carbon-based alternative, films of graphene are flexible and have been shown to allow 90% transparency with a lower electrical resistance than standard ITO. Thin metal films are also seen as a potential replacement material. A hybrid material alternative currently being tested is an electrode made of silver nanowires and covered with graphene. The advantages to such materials include maintaining transparency while simultaneously being electrically conductive and flexible.

=== Conductive polymers ===
Inherently conductive polymers (ICPs) are also being developed for some ITO applications. Typically the conductivity is lower for organic conducting polymers, such as polyaniline, than for inorganic materials, but they are more flexible, less expensive and more environmentally friendly.

=== Amorphous indium–zinc oxide ===
In order to reduce indium content, decrease processing difficulty, and improve electrical homogeneity, amorphous transparent conducting oxides have been developed. One such material, amorphous indium-zinc-oxide maintains short-range order even though crystallization is disrupted by the difference in the ratio of oxygen to metal atoms between In_{2}O_{3} and ZnO. Indium-zinc-oxide has some comparable properties to ITO. The amorphous structure remains stable even up to 500 °C, which allows for important processing steps common in organic solar cells. The improvement in homogeneity significantly enhances the usability of the material in the case of organic solar cells. Areas of poor electrode performance in organic solar cells render a percentage of the cell's area unusable.

== See also ==
- Transparent conducting film
