= Whole lung lavage =

- Other names: Lung washing
- ICD-9-CM: 33.99

Whole lung lavage (WLL), also called lung washing, is a medical procedure in which the patient's lungs are washed with saline (salt water) by filling and draining repeatedly. It is used to treat pulmonary alveolar proteinosis, in which excess lung surfactant proteins prevent the patient from breathing. Some sources consider it a variation of bronchoalveolar lavage.

WLL has been experimentally used for silicosis, other forms of mineral inhalation, and accidental inhalation of radioactive dust. It appears to effectively remove these foreign particles. WLL treatments may slow down the lung function decline of miners with pneumoconiosis.

== Medical uses ==
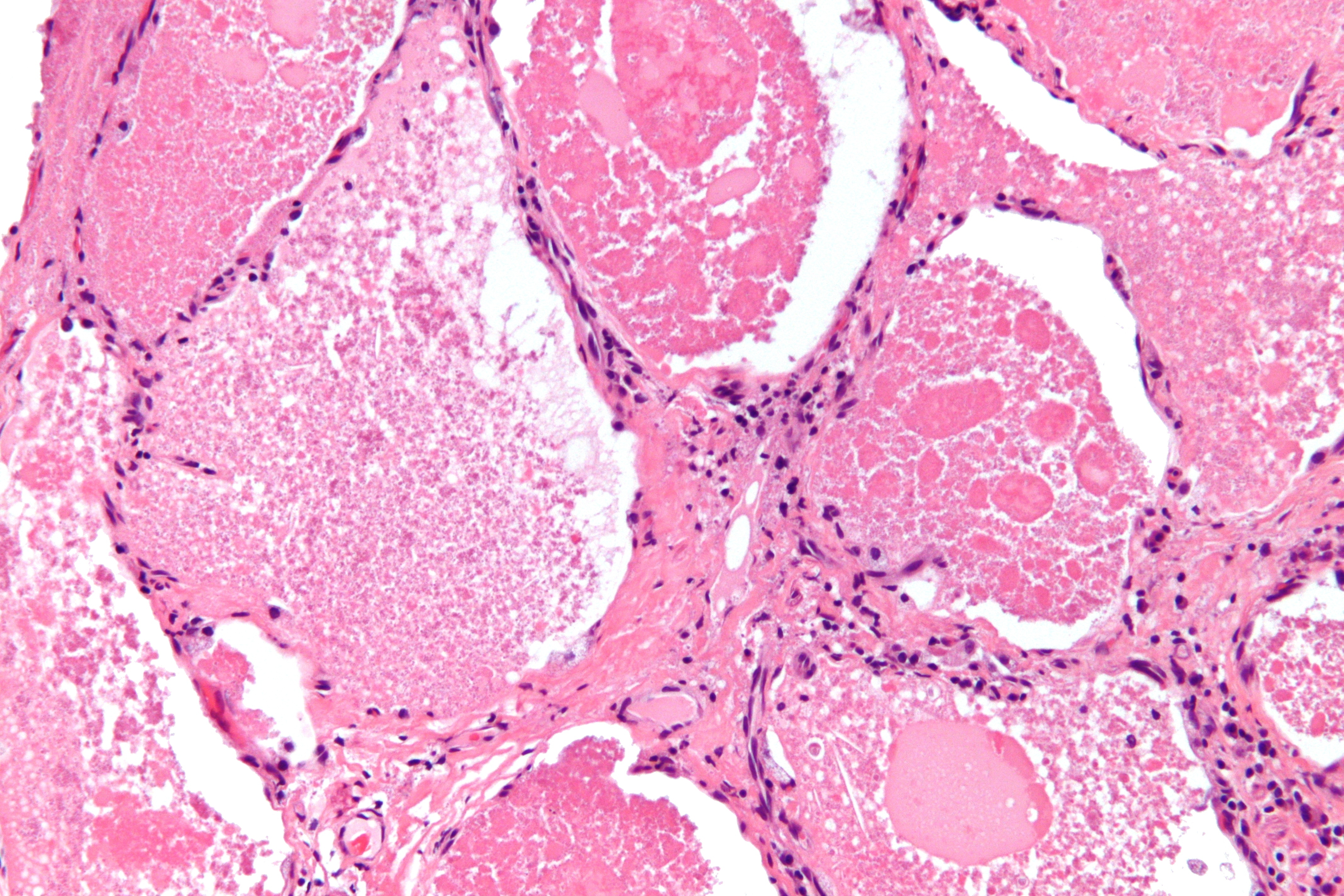
High magnification micrograph of pulmonary alveolar proteinosis. The images show the characteristic airspace filling with focally dense hyaline globs.

Whole lung lavage (WLL) is primarily used for treating conditions like pulmonary alveolar proteinosis (PAP), where it helps remove accumulated surfactant proteins from the lungs. However, its application extends to other respiratory conditions, including Acute respiratory distress syndrome (ARDS). In the context of ARDS, whole lung lavage has been explored as a treatment method, especially in experimental models. Studies have shown that WLL can be used to deplete surfactant, followed by the administration of surfactant replacement therapies. This approach helps improve lung function and oxygenation in conditions like neonatal ARDS. WLL is not a standard treatment for ARDS, but is used in research settings to model and study ARDS treatment strategies. The primary goal in these scenarios is to understand how surfactant therapy and mechanical ventilation strategies can be optimized to treat ARDS more effectively.

== Procedure and technique ==
WLL is not a standardized procedure. Patients are usually first put under general anesthesia. A double lumen endotracheal tube is used to keep one lung breathing while the other is being washed. The lung to be washed is filled with fluid by gravity, then drained. Drainage can be done by suction or gravity. Some versions add a shaking step between the filling and draining to help with the washing. The procedure typically uses 10–20 liters of fluid per patient, but severe cases require up to 50.

Variations on the WLL include a "mini-WLL" with reduced infusion volume. Reducing the suction power seems to reduce lung injury.

== Solutions ==
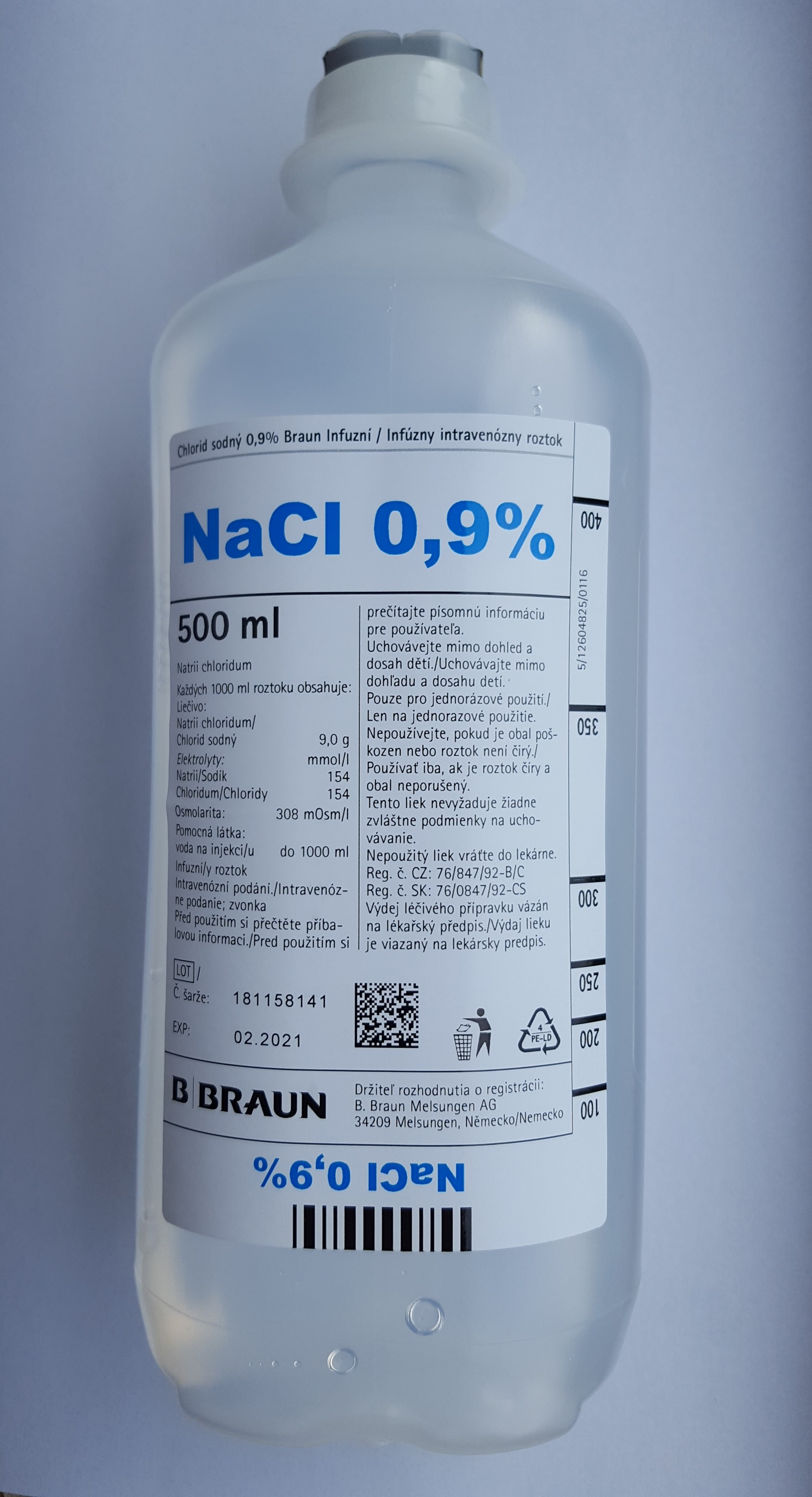
Saline solution

The primary solution used in WLL is a sterile, isotonic saline solution. This solution closely matches the osmolarity of body fluids, making it gentle on the lung tissues. The saline serves several purposes. It helps dissolve the surfactant and proteinaceous material deposited in the alveoli, facilitating its removal from the lungs. Saline instillation helps maintain lung expansion during the lavage process, preventing atelectasis (collapse of lung tissue). The total volume of saline used can vary but typically ranges from 15 to 20 liters per lung, administered in aliquots of 500 to 1000 ml. Exogenous surfactant may be administered to help restore normal lung function after lavage.

== Devices ==
A double-lumen endobronchial tube (DLT) is used to isolate each lung. This allows one lung to be ventilated while the other lung is lavaged. The DLT has two separate lumens for independent lung ventilation and lavage. It ensures that the patient maintains adequate oxygenation during the procedure, as one lung remains functional while the other is being washed.

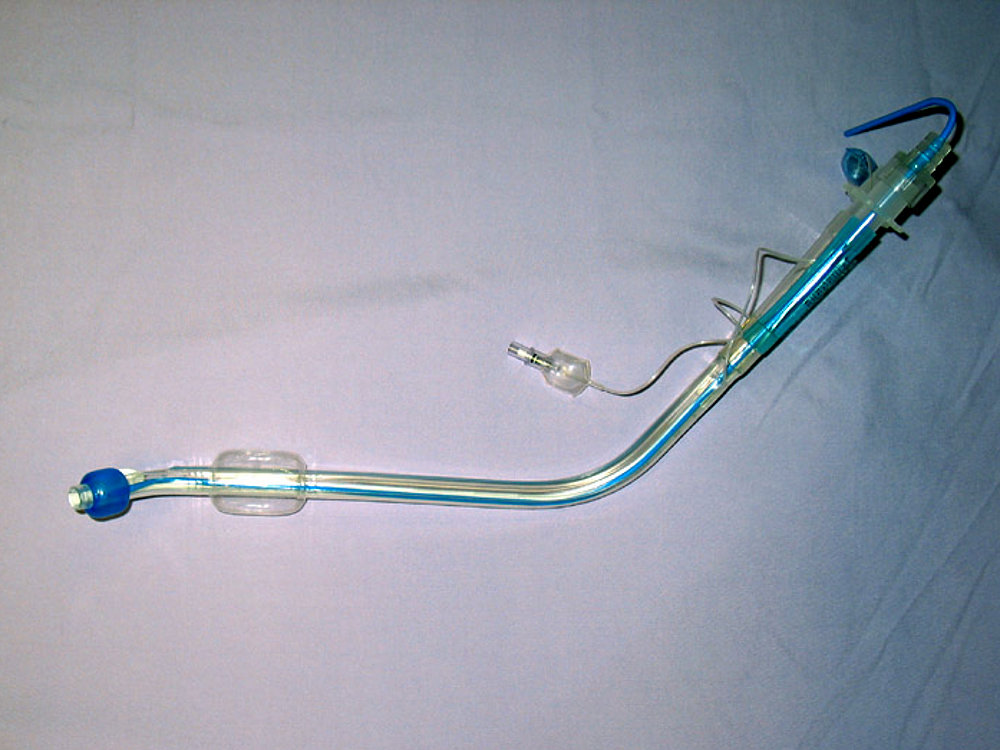
Double-lumen endobronchial tube

== Adverse effects ==
Whole lung lavage (WLL) is a relatively safe procedure when performed by experienced medical teams, but it carries some risks and potential adverse effects. During the procedure, one lung is ventilated while the other is being lavaged, which can temporarily reduce oxygenation. Hypoxemia and dypsnea is a common but usually manageable complication, and oxygen levels are closely monitored throughout the procedure.

== Mechanism of action ==
=== Removal of accumulated surfactant ===
In PAP, surfactant proteins and lipids accumulate in the alveoli, impairing gas exchange and leading to respiratory insufficiency. WLL works by instilling large volumes of saline into the lung, which helps to dissolve and mobilize these accumulated materials. The saline, along with the dissolved surfactant, is then drained from the lung, effectively clearing the alveolar spaces.

=== Restoration of alveolar function ===
By physically washing out the debris and excess surfactant, WLL restores the normal architecture of the alveoli. This improves their ability to facilitate gas exchange, leading to better oxygenation of the blood and overall respiratory function.

Reduction of inflammatory mediators

In addition to surfactant removal, WLL can help reduce the concentration of inflammatory mediators within the alveoli. This can be particularly beneficial in conditions involving lung inflammation, as it helps to alleviate the inflammatory response and promote healing of the lung tissue.

Improvement of lung compliance and oxygenation

The removal of excess material from the alveoli improves lung compliance (the ability of the lungs to expand and contract). This leads to more effective ventilation and better oxygenation of the blood. Patients often experience a significant improvement in symptoms such as shortness of breath following WLL

== History ==
In 1963, Dr. Jose Ramirez-Rivera at the Veterans' Administration Hospital in Baltimore tried repeated instillation of normal saline by a transtracheal plastic catheter positioned in one lung at a time in a series of two patients. Aliquots of 100 mL of warmed saline were instilled at a rate of 50–60 drops per minute. This process was repeated four times a day for 2–3 weeks. This technique showed improvement in chest-X-ray, diffusion capacity and histo-pathological findings. It was a prolonged and distressing procedure. The technique was thought to be imperfect and therefore denounced by many physicians at that time. In 1964, Ramirez-Rivera used a double lumen endotracheal tube (DLT) to isolate each lung, instilling up to 3 L saline containing heparin or acetylcysteine. This trial provided evidence that such a procedure was safe and feasible. Over the next four decades, the procedure was further refined using general anesthesia, increased lavage volumes use of saline alone, and by performing bilateral sequential WLL in the same treatment session.

== See also ==
- Asbestosis
- Asthma
- Chronic obstructive pulmonary disease
- COVID-19
- Lung cancer
- Mesothelioma
