= Antiseptic lavage =

Medical treatment using antiseptic washes

Antiseptic lavage is a means of washing, especially of a hollow organ, such as the stomach or lower bowel, with repeated injections of warm water mixed with an antiseptic or antifungal solution. Antiseptic lavages are commonly used as a treatment to pericoronitis of wisdom teeth.

Applying antibacterial solutions to wash out wounds may reduce infection rates compared with non-antibacterial products. Pumping the washing solution into the wound may reduce infections compared with other methods of washing out.
