= Arthroscopic lavage =

Arthroscopic lavage is the washing out or cleaning out the contents (blood, fluid or loose debris) inside a joint space. Lavage is a general term referring to the therapeutic washing, cleaning or rinsing.

== Medical uses ==
Excessive growth of irritated synovial membrane causes it to increase its surface area by buckling into fronds, and the fronds may become inflamed and pour destructive enzymes into the joint space, causing joint swelling and joint surface destruction. Removing this excess material via lavage frequently resolves arthritic knee inflammation or pain.

Arthroscopic lavage is one of many procedures available to help reverse the damage of early arthritis. There is, however, controversy about the value of simple lavage and debridement for the older patient with established osteoarthritis.

Needle lavage should not be used in an attempt to treat persons seeking long-term relief for symptomatic osteoarthritis of the knee. The use of this treatment in this case has not been shown to decrease pain, stiffness, tenderness, or swelling, or to increase 50-foot walking time or body function.
