= Bronchoalveolar lavage =

Diagnostic method of the lower respiratory system

- Pronunciation: /ˌbrɒŋkoʊˌælviˈoʊlər ləˈvɑːʒ/ BRONG-koh-AL-vee-OH-lər lə-VAHZH
- Other names: Bronchoalveolar washing
- ICD-9-CM: 33.24
- MeSH: D018893

Bronchoalveolar lavage (BAL), also known as bronchoalveolar washing, is a diagnostic method of the lower respiratory system in which a bronchoscope is passed through the mouth or nose into an appropriate airway in the lungs, with a measured amount of fluid introduced and then collected for examination. This method is typically performed to diagnose pathogenic infections of the lower respiratory airways (e.g. pneumonia and COVID-19), though it also has been shown to have utility in diagnosing interstitial lung disease. Bronchoalveolar lavage can be a more sensitive method of detection than nasal swabs in respiratory molecular diagnostics, as has been the case with SARS-CoV-2 where bronchoalveolar lavage samples detect copies of viral RNA after negative nasal swab testing.

In particular, bronchoalveolar lavage is commonly used to diagnose infections in people with immune system problems, pneumonia in people on ventilators, and acute respiratory distress syndrome (ARDS). It is the most common method used to sample the epithelial lining fluid (ELF) and to determine the protein composition of the pulmonary airways.

BAL has even been used therapeutically to remove mucus (sputum), improve airway ventilation, and reduce airway inflammation in conditions such as chronic obstructive pulmonary disease (COPD) and pediatric Mycoplasma pneumonia. A much more intense version involving up to 50 liters of fluid is called whole lung lavage (WLL) and is used to treat pulmonary alveolar proteinosis (PAP). When conditions disallow WLL, an endoscopic BAL can be used as a bridging procedure.

== Equipment and procedure ==
The primary equipment used in BAL includes a fiber-optic bronchoscope, sterile collection traps for collecting test specimens, a sterile saline source, a suction device, and suction tubing. Essentially, the saline source is connected to sterile bronchoscope, as is the specimen collection trap, and then suction tubing is connected to the trap and the suction source. If the bronchoscope is not sterile, saline should initially be used to flush it clean. With the patient under some sort of anesthesia (depending on the rigidity of the scope), the fiber-optic cable is lowered into the correct area of the lower lungs (tracheobronchial tree), wedged into place, and saline applied. Once the saline is fully applied, then either suction is applied to collect the fluids, or the fluids are collected with a sterile syringe through the irrigation channel. The collection trap is then appropriately labeled and sent off for testing.

Recent literature for the use of endoscopic BAL in therapy uses essentially the same process. A flexible bronchoscope is most commonly used. The physician seeks out areas with excess mucus or other abnormalities, then uses saline and suction to clean it.

== See also ==
- Asbestosis
- Asthma
- Chronic obstructive pulmonary disease
- COVID-19
- Lung cancer
- Mesothelioma
- Pneumoconiosis
- Silicosis
