= IRF4 =

Protein-coding gene in the species Homo sapiens

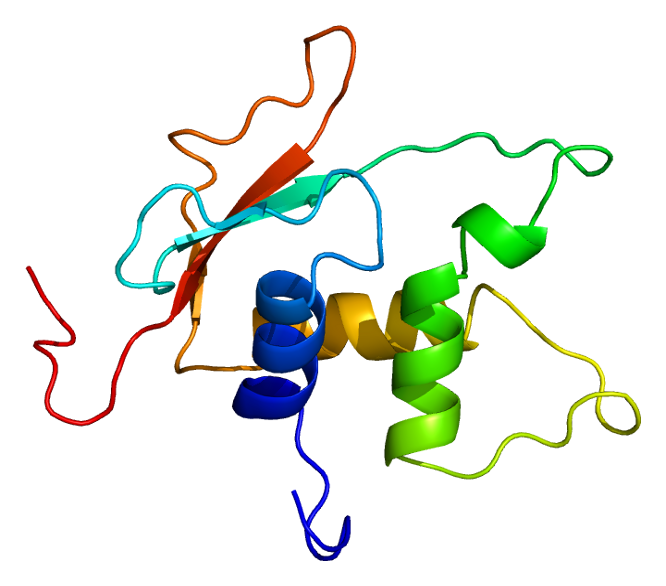

Identifiers
- Aliases: IRF4, LSIRF, MUM1, NF-EM5, SHEP8, interferon regulatory factor 4
- External IDs: OMIM: 601900; MGI: 1096873; GeneCards: IRF4
Available structures
PDB	Ortholog search: PDBe RCSB
PDB	List of PDB id codes 2DLL

Gene location (Human)
Chr.	Chromosome 6 (human)
Band	6p25.3	Start	391,739 bp
Band	6p25.3	End	411,443 bp

Gene location (Mouse)
Chr.	Chromosome 13 (mouse)
Band	13|13 A3.2	Start	30,933,209 bp
Band	13|13 A3.2	End	30,950,959 bp
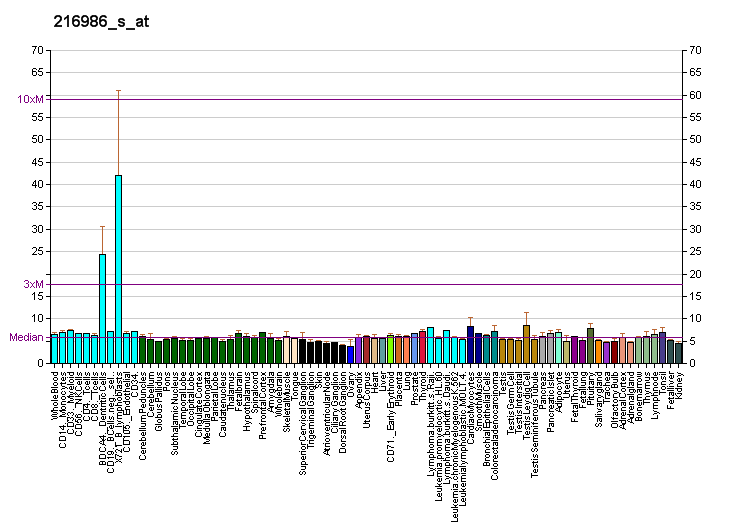

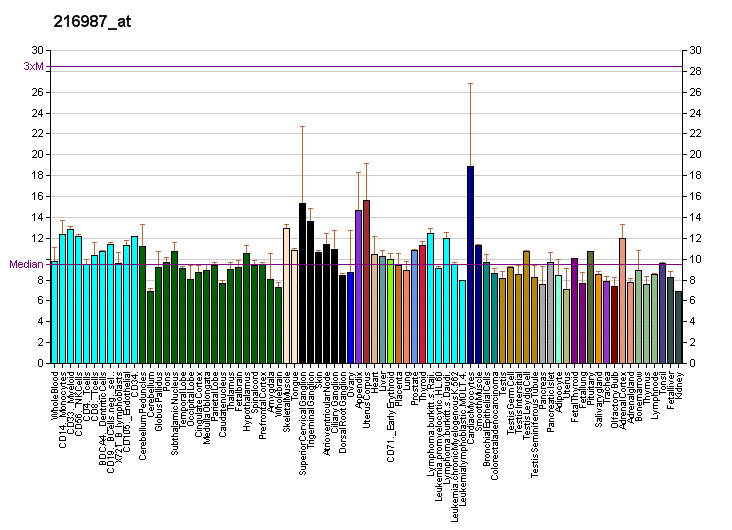
RNA expression pattern
Bgee	Human / Mouse (ortholog); Top expressed in: lymph node; canal of the cervix; appendix; bone marrow cell; cartilage tissue; spleen; epithelium of colon; ectocervix; rectum; superficial temporal artery / Top expressed in: mesenteric lymph nodes; spleen; blood; subcutaneous adipose tissue; granulocyte; brown adipose tissue; mammary gland; submandibular gland; bone marrow; embryo; More reference expression data
BioGPS	More reference expression data
Gene ontology
Molecular function	sequence-specific DNA binding; DNA binding; DNA-binding transcription factor activity; DNA-binding transcription activator activity, RNA polymerase II-specific; transcription factor binding; RNA polymerase II cis-regulatory region sequence-specific DNA binding; protein-lysine N-methyltransferase activity; protein binding; DNA-binding transcription factor activity, RNA polymerase II-specific
Cellular component	cytosol; membrane; nucleoplasm; nucleus
Biological process	regulation of transcription, DNA-templated; interferon-gamma-mediated signaling pathway; regulation of T-helper cell differentiation; myeloid dendritic cell differentiation; transcription, DNA-templated; T-helper 17 cell lineage commitment; positive regulation of transcription, DNA-templated; peptidyl-lysine methylation; negative regulation of toll-like receptor signaling pathway; type I interferon signaling pathway; histone H3 acetylation; histone H4 acetylation; positive regulation of DNA binding; T cell activation; positive regulation of transcription by RNA polymerase II; defense response to protozoan; protein methylation; transcription by RNA polymerase II; cytokine-mediated signaling pathway; positive regulation of cold-induced thermogenesis; immune system process
Sources:Amigo / QuickGO
Orthologs
Databases	NCBI: entry; OMA: entry
Species	Human	Mouse
Entrez	3662	16364
Ensembl	ENSG00000137265	ENSMUSG00000021356
UniProt	Q15306	Q64287
RefSeq (mRNA)	NM_001195286; NM_002460	NM_013674; NM_001347508
RefSeq (protein)	NP_001182215; NP_002451	NP_001334437; NP_038702
Location (UCSC)	Chr 6: 0.39 – 0.41 Mb	Chr 13: 30.93 – 30.95 Mb
PubMed search
- Wikidata
View/Edit Human	View/Edit Mouse

Interferon regulatory factor 4 (IRF4) also known as MUM1 is a protein that in humans is encoded by the IRF4 gene. IRF4 functions as a key regulatory transcription factor in the development of human immune cells. The expression of IRF4 is essential for the differentiation of T lymphocytes and B lymphocytes as well as certain myeloid cells. Dysregulation of the IRF4 gene can result in IRF4 functioning either as an oncogene or a tumor-suppressor, depending on the context of the modification.

The MUM1 symbol is also the current HGNC official symbol for melanoma associated antigen (mutated) 1 (HGNC:29641).

== Immune cell development ==
IRF4 is a transcription factor belonging to the Interferon Regulatory Factor (IRF) family of transcription factors. In contrast to some other IRF family members, IRF4 expression is not initiated by interferons; rather, IRF4 expression is promoted by a variety of bioactive stimuli, including antigen receptor engagement, lipopolysaccharide (LPS), IL-4, and CD40. IRF4 can function either as an activating or an inhibitory transcription factor depending on its transcription cofactors. IRF4 frequently cooperates with the cofactors B-cell lymphoma 6 protein (BCL6) and nuclear factor of activated T-cells (NFATs). IRF4 expression is limited to cells of the immune system, in particular T cells, B cells, macrophages and dendritic cells.

=== T cell differentiation ===
IRF4 plays an important role in the regulation of T cell differentiation. In particular, IRF4 ensures the differentiation of CD4^{+} T helper cells into distinct subsets. IRF4 is essential for the development of T_{h}2 cells and T_{h}17 cells. IRF4 regulates this differentiation via apoptosis and cytokine production, which can change depending on the stage of T cell development. For example, IRF4 limits production of Th2-associated cytokines in naïve T cells while its upregulates the production of Th2 cytokines in effector and memory T cells. While not essential, IRF4 is also believed to play a role in CD8^{+} cytotoxic T cell differentiation through its regulation of factors directly involved in this process, including BLIMP-1, BATF, T-bet, and RORγt. IRF4 is necessary for effector function of T regulatory cells due to its role as a regulatory factor for BLIMP-1.

=== B cell differentiation ===
IRF4 is an essential regulatory component at various stages of B cell development. In early B cell development, IRF4 functions alongside IRF8 to induce the expression of the Ikaros and Aiolos transcription factors, which decrease expression of the pre-B-cell-receptor. IRF4 then regulates the secondary rearrangement of κ and λ chains, making IRF4 essential for the continued development of the BCR.

IRF4 also occupies an essential position in the adaptive immune response of mature B cells. When IRF4 is absent, mature B cells fail to form germinal centers (GCs) and proliferate excessively in both the spleen and lymph nodes. IRF4 expression commences GC formation through its upregulation of transcription factors BCL6 and POU2AF1, which promote germinal center formation. IRF4 expression decreases in B cells once the germinal center forms, since IRF4 expression is not necessary for sustained GC function; however, IRF4 expression increases significantly when B cells prepare to leave the germinal center to form plasma cells.

==== Long-lived plasma cells ====
Long-lived plasma cells are memory B cells that secrete high-affinity antibodies and help preserve immunological memory to specific antigens. IRF4 plays a significant role at multiple stages of long-lived plasma cell differentiation. The effects of IRF4 expression are heavily dependent on the quantity of IRF4 present. A limited presence of IRF4 activates BCL6, which is essential for the formation of germinal centers, from which plasma cells differentiate. In contrast, elevated expression of IRF4 represses BCL6 expression and upregulates BLIMP-1 and Zbtb20 expression. This response, dependent on a high dose of IRF4, helps initiate the differentiation of germinal center B cells into plasma cells.

IRF4 expression is necessary for isotype class switch recombination in germinal center B cells that will become plasma cells. B cells that lack IRF4 fail to undergo immunoglobulin class switching. Without IRF4, B cells fail to upregulate the AID enzyme, a component necessary for inducing mutations in immunoglobulin switch regions of B cell DNA during somatic hypermutation. In the absence of IRF4, B cells will not differentiate into Ig-secreting plasma cells.

IRF4 expression continues to be necessary for long-lived plasma cells once differentiation has occurred. In the absence of IRF4, long-lived plasma cells disappear, suggesting that IRF4 plays a role in regulating molecules essential for the continued survival of these cells.

=== Myeloid cell differentiation ===
Among myeloid cells, IRF4 expression has been identified in dendritic cells (DCs) and macrophages.

==== Dendritic cells (DCs) ====
The transcription factors IRF4 and IRF8 work in concert to achieve DC differentiation. IRF4 expression is responsible for inducing development of CD4+ DCs, while IRF8 expression is necessary for the development of CD8+ DCs. Expression of either IRF4 or IRF8 can result in CD4-/CD8- DCs. Differentiation of DC subtypes also depends on IRF4's interaction with the growth factor GM-CSF. IRF4 expression is necessary for ensuring that monocyte-derived dendritic cells (Mo-DCs) can cross-present antigen to CD8+ cells.

==== Macrophages ====
IRF4 and IRF8 are also significant transcription factors in the differentiation of common myeloid progenitors (CMPs) into macrophages. IRF4 is expressed at a lower level than IRF8 in these progenitor cells; however, IRF4 expression appears to be particularly important for the development of M2 macrophages. JMJD3, which regulates IRF4, has been identified as an important regulator of M2 macrophage polarization, suggesting that IRF4 may also take part in this regulatory process.

== Clinical significance ==
In melanocytic cells the IRF4 gene may be regulated by MITF. IRF4 is a transcription factor that has been implicated in acute leukemia. This gene is strongly associated with pigmentation: sensitivity of skin to sun exposure, freckles, blue eyes, and brown hair color. A variant has been implicated in greying of hair.

The World Health Organization (2016) provisionally defined "large B-cell lymphoma with IRF4 rearrangement" as a rare indolent large B-cell lymphoma of children and adolescents. This indolent lymphoma mimics, and must be distinguished from, pediatric-type follicular lymphoma. The hallmark of large B-cell lymphoma with IRF4 rearrangement is the overexpression of the IRF4 gene by the disease's malignant cells. This overexpression is forced by the acquisition in these cells of a translocation of IRF4 from its site on the short (i.e. p) arm of chromosome 6 at position 25.3 to a site near the IGH@ immunoglobulin heavy locus on the long (i.e. q) arm of chromosome 14 at position 32.33

== Interactions ==
IRF4 has been shown to interact with:

- Aiolos,
- BATF3,
- Blimp-1,
- BCL6,
- CD40,
- GM-CSF,
- IL-4,
- Ikaros,
- IRF8,
- JMJD3,
- MMP12,
- NFATC2,
- SPI1, and
- STAT6.

== See also ==
- Interferon regulatory factors
