= AIDS-related lymphoma =

- Specialty: Hematology and oncology

AIDS-related lymphoma describes lymphomas occurring in patients with acquired immunodeficiency syndrome (AIDS).

A lymphoma is a type of cancer arising from lymphoid cells. In AIDS, the incidence of non-Hodgkin's lymphoma, primary cerebral lymphoma and Hodgkin's disease are all increased. There are three different varieties of AIDS-related lymphoma: Diffuse large B-cell lymphoma, B-cell immunoblastic lymphoma, and Burkitt's lymphoma (small non-cleaved cell lymphoma).

== Signs and symptoms ==
The histologic classification of the lymphoma, as well as the locations and severity of the disease, all influence the clinical presentation of HIV-related lymphomas. HIV-related lymphomas are more likely to present with advanced stage disease, constitutional symptoms (also known as "B" symptoms; fever, weight loss, and night sweats), extranodal involvement, or disease involving unusual locations (such as the body cavity or soft tissue) than lymphomas in the HIV-negative population.

HIV-related lymphomas can present with a variety of clinical symptoms, including organomegaly, lymphadenopathy, and/or constitutional symptoms. Unknown fever, cytopenias, tumor lysis syndrome (including lactic acidosis, hyperkalemia, hyperuricemia, hypocalcemia, hyperphosphatemia, and elevated lactate dehydrogenase), and other isolated laboratory abnormalities (such as hypercalcemia) are observed in certain patients.

== Causes ==
HIV-positive individuals' lymphomas vary widely and can be classified into several histologic subtypes. The two primary lymphoma types that develop in HIV-positive individuals are non-Hodgkin's lymphoma (NHL) and Hodgkin's lymphoma (HL).

Diffuse large B-cell lymphoma is a highly aggressive type of B-cell lymphoma. It is distinguished by the widespread proliferation of large neoplastic B lymphocytes with nuclei that are equal to or larger than normal histiocytic nuclei. The illness manifests with B symptoms at an advanced stage of the illness. It mostly affects patients who are severely immunosuppressed and can occur at nodal or extranodal sites, with the gastrointestinal tract being the most common site. It makes up between 45 and 50 percent of all lymphomas seen in this group, making it the most prevalent AIDS-associated lymphoma subtype. All ages are affected by DLBCL, which typically manifests as a rapidly growing lymph node mass in the neck or abdomen. Up to 40% of patients have extranodal extramedullary disease, and about 30% of patients exhibit B symptoms.

The second most prevalent NHL subtype that affects HIV-positive individuals with a comparatively high CD4 cell count is Burkitt's lymphoma. Patients typically have elevated lactate dehydrogenase levels and poor performance status. The central nervous system is involved in 8 to 28% of cases, with extranodal involvement occurring more frequently. It usually manifests at a younger age and with CD4 cell counts greater than 200 cells/μL. It develops quickly and is a kind of tumor that starts from B cells. In addition, it is fatal if untreated. Burkitt's lymphoma is linked to a high incidence of oral cavity involvement and makes up 10-15% of AIDS-defining lymphomas. Three clinical subtypes of Burkitt's lymphoma have been identified: endemic, sporadic, and immunodeficiency-related. Thirty to forty percent of AIDS-related NHL cases are Burkitt's lymphoma subtype, which is most prevalent in HIV/AIDS patients.

Primary central nervous system lymphoma (PCNSL) is a subtype of NHL that impacts the eyes, brain, spine, and cerebrospinal fluid in the central nervous system. It appears in patients who have severe immune suppression; since the advent of highly active antiretroviral therapy, its incidence has declined in these patients. The majority of PCNSL linked to HIV is Epstein-Barr virus positive. Furthermore, unlike HIV-negative PCNSL, patients typically present with multiple brain lesions and/or changes in mental status or focal neurologic symptoms. Changes in mental state, intracranial pressure symptoms (headache, nausea, vomiting, papilledema), and local compression symptoms (epilepsy, memory loss, unstable gait, visual impairment, slurred speech) are the most common symptoms of PCNSL.

Primary effusion lymphoma is a distinct subtype of aggressive B-cell NHL. It is brought on by HHV8, commonly referred to as KSHV, or Kaposi sarcoma-associated herpesvirus. It is uncommon, making up 0.3% of NHL in the general population and 4% of NHL linked to HIV. Between 60 and 90 percent of cases of primary effusion lymphoma have EBV co-infection, although its pathogenesis is unknown. There are malignant lymphomatous effusions in the pericardium, peritoneal cavity, and pleural space.

Plasmablastic lymphoma (PBL) originates from terminally differentiated, activated B-cells at the post-germinal center that are changing from immunoblasts to plasma cells. About 2% of all AIDS-associated lymphomas are PBL-associated lymphomas. HIV infection is closely associated with this uncommon form of lymphoma, which primarily affects the oral cavity.

With a widespread proliferation of massive neoplastic cells that resemble B-cell immunoblasts but have the immunophenotype of plasma cells, it is incredibly aggressive.

Hodgkin lymphoma (HL) is one of the most common cancers that do not indicate AIDS, and since highly active antiretroviral therapy was introduced, its incidence has increased. It is a germinal center-derived cell that produces Hodgkin Reed–Sternberg (HRS) cells. It is more common in immunocompromised individuals, especially those with HIV. Compared to mild immune compromise, the incidence of HL is lower in states of extreme immunodeficiency. It's possible that there was insufficient immunological contact between non-neoplastic inflammatory cells and HRS cells.

== Mechanism ==
HIV-positive patients have a higher incidence of malignancies for a variety of reasons. These consist of inflammation, cytokine dysregulation, and persistent antigenic stimulation. Moreover, oncogenic viruses are more likely to infect HIV/AIDS patients. Thus, a variety of factors, such as a compromised immune system, genetic changes, viral infection, and persistent B cell activation, contribute to the pathogenesis of HIV/AIDS-associated lymphoma.
