= Pediatric-type follicular lymphoma =

- Other names: Pediatric follicular lymphoma, pediatric-type nodular follicular lymphoma
- Specialty: Hematology, oncology

Pediatric-type follicular lymphoma (PTFL) is a disease in which malignant B-cells (i.e. a lymphocyte subtype originating from the bone marrow) accumulate in, overcrowd, and cause the expansion of the lymphoid follicles in, and thereby enlargement of the lymph nodes in the head and neck regions and, less commonly, groin and armpit regions. The disease accounts for 1.5% to 2% of all the lymphomas that occur in the pediatric age group.

Initially, PTFL was found only in children and adolescents and termed Pediatric follicular lymphoma. More recently, however, the disease has been found to occur also in adults. This lead the World health Organization (2016) to rename the disorder pediatric-type follicular lymphoma. (The disease is also referred to as pediatric-type nodular follicular lymphoma.) At the same time the World Health Organization also recognized PTFL as a clinical entity distinct from the follicular lymphoma disorders in which it was previously classified. This reclassification was based on fundamental differences between the two diseases.

PTFL differs from follicular lymphoma in its clinical manifestations, its pathophysiology including the genomic alterations (i.e. chromosome abnormalities and gene mutations) which occur in the diseases malignant cells, and its clinical course. Relative to the last point, PTFL often presents histologically as a high-grade malignancy but unlike the small percentage of follicular lymphoma cases that similarly present as a high grade malignancy, it almost invariably takes an indolent, relapsing and remitting course without progressing to a more aggressive and incurable form. Recognition of PTFL as a distinct disease separate from follicular lymphoma is critical to avoid mistaking it for a more aggressive lymphoma that requires potentially toxic chemotherapy treatments. This appears to be particularly the case when PTFL occurs in children, adolescents, and perhaps very young adults.

A significant percentage of cases that were once diagnosed as PTFL are now regarded as being large B-cell lymphoma with IRF4 rearrangements, a very rare disease that was provisionally defined by the World Health organization (2016) as distinctly separate from PTFL. PTFL is here described based on this recently formulated and important distinction.

== Presentation ==
PTFL occurs in male (male to female ratio ~10;1) children or adolescents (ages 1–17 years, median age ~13-14), less frequently in young adults (ages 18–30 years), and occasionally in older adults. In ~90% of cases, the diseases is diagnosed in an early stage (i.e. stage I or II) and localized to one or two adjacent lymph node chains.

Historically, PTFL has been described as commonly presenting with swollen lymph nodes and/or tonsils in the head and neck regions, less commonly as swollen lymph nodes in the axillary and/or inguinal regions, and/or rarely as swollen lymph nodes in the abdomen and/or infiltrations of the malignant cells into the testes, bone marrow, and/or central nervous system. However, many if not all of the latter rare cases as well as cases that exhibit tonsil involvement are now regarded by the World Health Organization (2016) as due to a provisional entity termed large B-cell lymphoma with IRF4 rearrangement. This diseases is a follicular-type large B-cell lymphoma that also afflicts children, adolescents, and young adults but is otherwise distinguished from PTFL by its lack of a strong predominance in males, its common occurrence in extra-nodal sites, its histology, its clinical course, and the genomic alterations carried by its malignant B-cells, particularly the hallmark translocation of the IRF4 (interferon regulatory factor 4) gene (also termed the MUM1 or melanoma associated antigen (mutated) 1 gene) on the short (i.e. p) arm of chromosome 6 at position 25.3 near to the IGH@ immunoglobulin heavy locus on the long (i.e. q) arm of chromosome 14 at position 32.33 This acquired genomic abnormality forces the overexpression of interferon regulatory factor protein. Excluding cases now regarded as being large B-cell lymphomas with IRF4 rearrangement, PTFL presents almost exclusively with enlargement of lymph nodes in the head, neck, axilla, or groin.

== Pathophysiology ==
PTFL is the proliferation of a clone (i.e. a group of genetically identical cells that share a common ancestry) of B-cells that act non-physiologically by invading and disrupting the structure and function of lymphoid tissues. This cell clone forms, increases in size, and spreads to other lymphoid tissues in association with its progressively increasing accumulation of numerous chromosome deletions and gene mutations, although different sets of these alterations occur in different individuals with the disease. These alterations are thought to promote the survival of the malignant cells by inhibiting their programmed cell death, blocking their maturation, increasing their ability to evade the immune system, and/or creating conditions favorable for the development of other genomic alterations that have these pro-malignancy effects. The most common chromosome deletion is the 1p36 deletion which occurs in 20-50% of PTFL cases. This alteration is a deletion in the q arm of chromosome 1 at position 36 that results in the lose of TNFAIP3, a gene that encodes tumor necrosis factor, alpha-induced protein 3. This protein functions to inhibit the activation of NF-κB, to block programmed cell death, and to regulate lymphocyte-based immune responses through its ubiquitin ligase activity. Other alterations repeatedly seen in PTFL include mutations in the following genes: 1) TNFRSF14 (30-50% of cases) which encodes tumor necrosis factor receptor superfamily, member 14, a receptor that stimulates immune responses in T-cells, a set of non-B-cell lymphocytes; 2) IRF8 (10-50% of cases) which encodes the interferon regulatory factor 8 protein, a protein that contributes to the maturation and function of B-cells; 3) MAP2K1 (10-40% of cases), which encodes mitogen-activated protein kinase kinase 1, an enzyme which activates the MAPK/ERK cell signaling pathway that regulates cell proliferation and the expression of various genes; and 4) scores of other genes that are found in up to 15% of cases. Recent Whole exome sequencing studies in children and adolescents with PTFL have confirmed these results, found that many of these genomic alterations result in suppressing either the MAPK/ERK or G protein-coupled receptor signaling pathways, and suggest that the suppression of these pathways contributes to the development of PFFL.

== Diagnosis ==
The diagnosis of PTFL depends on a constellation of findings related to its presentation, tissue distribution, histology, and expression of certain proteins and genomic abnormalities. The disease occurs in males (~90% of cases) that are more often children, adolescents, or young adults who have enlargement of lymph nodes located in one or two nearby sites of the head or neck or less commonly, armpit or groin regions. Histopathological examination of the involved lymph nodes reveals medium- to large-sized lymphoblasts mixed with occasional macrophages and rare centrocytes and centroblasts that together form follicular structures that partially or completely replace the nodes' normal structure with irregularly shaped and merged follicles, abnormally attenuated mantle zones, and the presence of helper T-cells that are pushed to the periphery of the follicles. Its histology is most often rated as high grade and by this criterion defines the disease as an aggressive grade III lymphoma (see follicular lymphoma grading). Nonetheless, PTFL almost always behaves as a non-aggressive or minimally aggressive malignancy. Immunohistiochemical analyses of the involved tissues indicates that the malignant cells express CD20, CD10, and BCL6 but not BCL2 or interferon regulatory factor protein. Genomic analyses of these cells indicate that they have a clonal rearrangement in their IgH genes in all cases and in many cases the Ip6 deletion and gene mutations cited in the above pathophysiology section. These cells lack the t(14:18)(q32:q21.3) translocation which is characteristic of malignant cells in follicular lymphoma but in a small percentage of cases still overexpress the TNFRSF14 gene product which is a consequence of this translocation. The exact cause for this overexpression is unclear.

=== Differential diagnosis ===
The following lymphocyte disorders may be confused with but can be distinguished from PTFL based on the following points:

- Follicular lymphoma does not have a strong male-predominance; is most common in older adults; is usually associated with the involvement of other tissues (e.g. bone marrow) in addition to lymph nodes; and has a histology that is usually dominated by centrocytes and centorblasts; that in >85-90% of cases have the t(14:18)(q32:q21.3) translocation; and in 10-40% of cases MAP2K1 mutations.
- Large B-cell lymphoma with IRF4 rearrangement often occurs in females (male to female ratio 1-1.2 to 1:1.5); has not yet been reported to occur in adults; almost always involves non-nodal tissues in addition to lymph nodes; has a histology in involved tissues that is similar to diffuse large cell lymphomas; and has malignant cells that overexpress interferon regulatory factor protein in almost all cases, frequently express BC10, and in most cases exhibit overt rearrangements of the IRF4 gene.
- The pediatric form of Marginal zone B-cell lymphoma has lymph node lesions consisting of a mixed population of monocyte-like cells, plasma cells, and lymphoblasts; its malignant cells do not to express CD10 and BCL6 and have relatively few genomic abnormalities except for trisomy 18 (up to 20% of cases).
- Benign reactive lymph node and follicular hyperplasia's lymph nodes do not exhibit irregularly shaped and merged follicles, abnormally attenuated mantle zones, or the presence of helper T-cells that are pushed to the periphery of the follicles.

== Treatment ==
Virtually all cases of PTFL, even if treated with minimal interventions such as surgical removal or a watch-and-wait approach, have had a relatively benign and sometimes remitting and relapsing course. Thus, past recommendations that these patients need to be evaluated by bone marrow biopsy, lumbar puncture, or other invasive and/or expensive procedures requires revaluation. The evaluation of therapeutic regimens used to treat PTFL is complicated by their purely retrospective nature and inclusion of cases which in retrospect were likely cases of large B-cell lymphoma with IRF4 rearrangement. In any event, many of these cases were treated with chemotherapeutic regimens, principally, CHOP (i.e. cyclophosphamide, hydroxydaunorubicin, vincristine, prednisone) or R-CHOP (i.e. CHOP plus rituximab) while others, which likely excluded large B-cell lymphoma with IRF4 rearrangement, were treated with surgical removal, localized radiation therapy, and/or watch-and-wait strategies. All of these treatments have yielded in pediatric patients overall survival rates of 100% and relapse rates of 0 to 6% as observed over variable observation periods of up to 5 years. Among this group, 36 pediatric patients were treated with surgical resection alone followed by observation with all patients surviving and only one having a relapse. Most adults with PTFL have been treated more vigorously with regimens consisting of immunochemotherapy (e.g. R-CHOP) and/or radiation therapy. This more vigorous approach has been used because the distinction between PTFL and aggressive follicular lymphoma is not as clear in adults as it is in younger patients. Thus, current recommendations for the treatment of pediatric PTFL patients is watch-and-wait following radiation therapy or complete surgical resection; in cases where surgical resection is incomplete, immunechemotherapy is added to the regimen. The recommended treatment of adults with PTFL is less clear. Currently used regimens rely on immunochemotherapy but might change if the issue of discriminating PTFL from follicular lymphoma can be resolved.
