= Plasmablastic lymphoma =

Type of large B-cell lymphoma

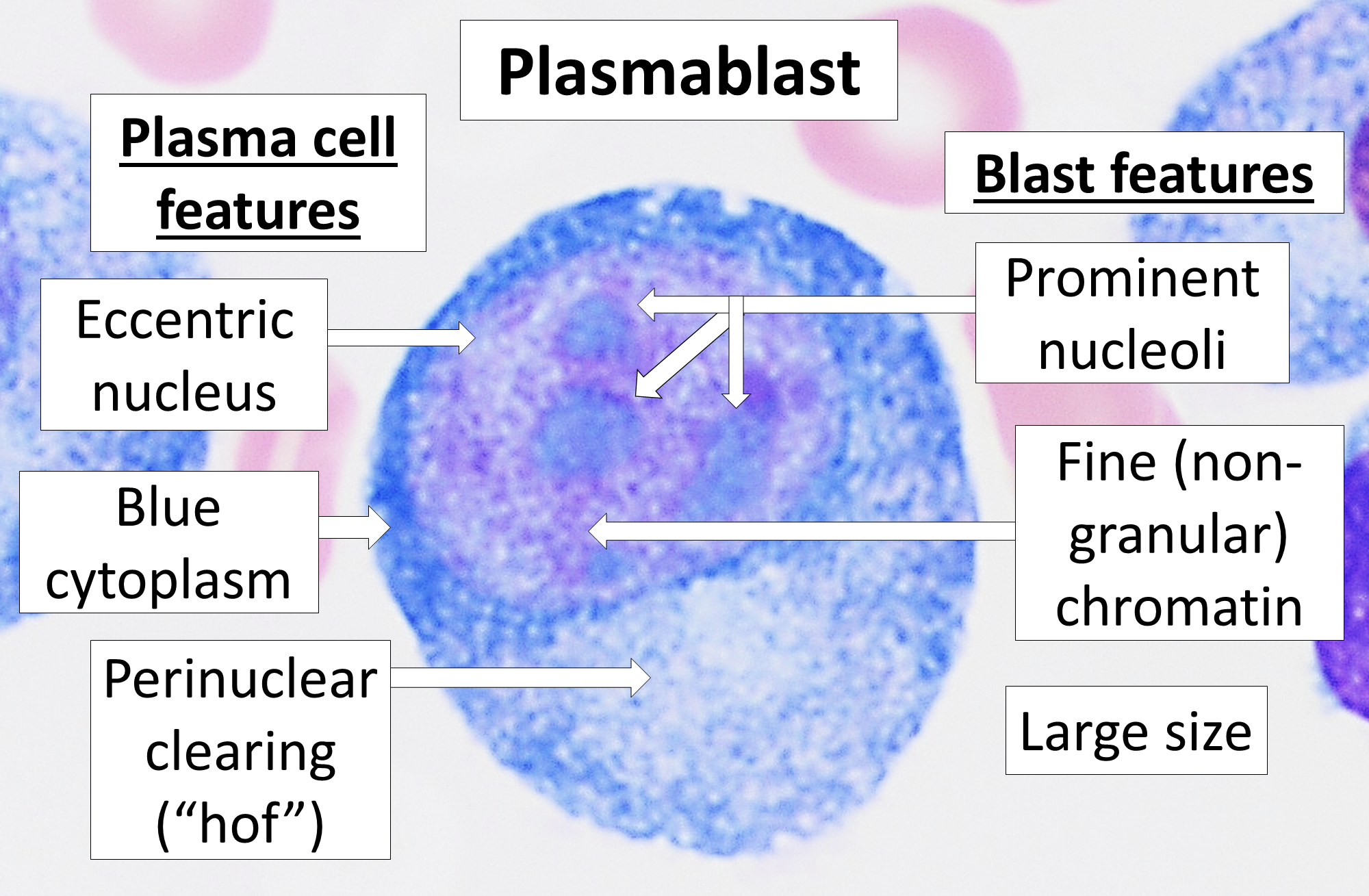
Plasmablast, Wright stain

Plasmablastic lymphoma (PBL) is a type of large B-cell lymphoma recognized by the World Health Organization (WHO) in 2017 as belonging to a subgroup of lymphomas termed lymphoid neoplasms with plasmablastic differentiation. The other lymphoid neoplasms within this subgroup are: plasmablastic plasma cell lymphoma (or the plasmacytoma variant of this disease); primary effusion lymphoma that is Kaposi's sarcoma-associated herpesvirus positive or Kaposi's sarcoma-associated Herpesvirus negative; anaplastic lymphoma kinase-positive large B-cell lymphoma; and human herpesvirus 8-positive diffuse large B-cell lymphoma, not otherwise specified. All of these lymphomas are malignancies of plasmablasts, i.e. B-cells that have differentiated into plasmablasts but because of their malignant nature: fail to differentiate further into mature plasma cells; proliferate excessively; and accumulate in and injure various tissues and organs.

The lymphomas in the lymphoid neoplasms with plasmablastic differentiation sub-group that are not PBL have sometimes been incorrectly considered to be variants of PBL. Each of the lymphomas in this subgroup of malignancies have distinctive clinical, morphological, and abnormal gene features. However, key features of these lymphomas sometime overlap with other lymphomas including those that are in this sub-group. In consequence, correctly diagnosing these lymphomas has been challenging. Nonetheless, it is particularly important to diagnose them correctly because they can have very different prognoses and treatments than the lymphomas which they resemble.

Plasmablastic lymphomas are aggressive and rare malignancies that usually respond poorly to chemotherapy and carry a very poor prognosis. They occur predominantly in males who have HIV/AIDS, had a solid organ transplant, or are immunosuppressed in other ways; ~5% of all individuals with PBL appear to be immunocompetent, i.e. to have no apparent defect in their immune system. The malignant plasmablasts in more than half the cases of PBL are infected with a potentially cancer-causing virus, Epstein–Barr virus (EBV), and rare cases of PBL appear due to the plasmablastic transformation of a preexisting low-grade B-cell lymphoma. One variant of PBL, sometimes termed plasmablastic lymphoma of the elderly, has a significantly better prognosis than most other cases of PBL. The development of this variant appears due, at least in part, to immunosenescence, i.e. the immunodeficiency occurring in old age.

== Presentation ==
Plasmablastic lymphoma lesions are most commonly rapidly growing, soft tissue masses that may be ulcerating, bleeding, and/or painful. In a recent (2020) review of published cases, individuals presenting with PBL were typically middle-aged or elderly (range 1–88 years; median age 58 tears) males (~73% of cases). Only a few cases have been reported in pediatric cases. The PBL lesions occurred most commonly in lymph nodes (~23% of cases), the gastrointestinal tract (~18%), bone marrow (16%), and oral cavity (12%). Less frequently involved tissues include the skin, genitourinary tract, paranasal sinuses, lung, and bones. While cases of PBL may present as a primary oral, or, very rarely a skin or lymph node disease, most individuals present with a widespread stage III or IV disease which in ~40% of cases, is accompanied by systemic B-symptoms such as fever, night sweats, and recent weight loss. Some 48%-63% of PBL cases occur in individuals with HIV/AIDS; ~80% of these HIV/AIDS-afflicted individuals have EBV+ disease whereas only ~50% of PBL individuals that do not have HIV/AIDS are EBV-positive. Individuals with PBL often present with a history of being immunosuppressed due to prior organ transplantation, immunosuppressive drug treatment, or other causes. This is particularly the case for individuals with HIV/AIDS-negative disease. Individuals who develop PBL following organ transplantation are EBV/AIDS-positive in >85% of cases. Most post-transplant and HIV/AIDS-positive patients have an extremely aggressive disease. However, patients whose major contributing factor to PBL-development is EBV-positivity often present with, and continue to have, a significantly less aggressive disease than other patients with PBL. It is similarly clear that, on average, individuals who are elderly (>68 years) or have HIV/AIDS-negative disease likewise present with, and continue to have, a significantly less aggressive cancer.

== Pathophysiology ==
In addition to the immunodeficiency-causing viral disease, HIV/AIDS (which is an AIDS-defining clinical condition), recent studies have diagnosed PBL in individuals who have one or more other causes for immunodeficiency. These causes include prior organ transplantation; immunosuppressive drugs; autoimmune and chronic inflammatory diseases (e.g. hepatitis C, rheumatoid arthritis, Graves' disease, Giant-cell arteritis, sarcoidosis, and severe psoriasis); and immunosenescence due to age (e.g. >60 years). Rare cases of PDL have also occurred as a transformation of a low grade B-cell malignancy such as chronic lymphocytic leukemia/small lymphocytic lymphoma and follicular lymphoma. Studies also find that 60-75% of individuals diagnosed with PBL have Epstein–Barr virus-infected plasmablasts. EBV infects ~95% of the world's population to cause no symptoms, minor non-specific symptoms, or infectious mononucleosis. The virus then enters a latency phase in which infected individuals become lifetime asymptomatic carriers of the virus in a set of their B-cells. Some weeks, months, years, or decades thereafter, a very small fraction of these carriers, particularly those with an immunodeficiency, develop any one of various EBV-associated benign or malignant diseases, including, in extremely rare cases, Epstein–Barr virus-positive plasmablastic lymphoma. The virus in infected plasmablastic cells appears to be in its latency I phase; consequently, these infected cells express EBV products such as EBER nuclear RNAs and BART microRNAs. These RNAs promote infected cells to proliferate, avoid attack by the host's immune system's cytotoxic T-cells, and, possibly, block the infected cells' apoptosis (i.e. programmed cell death) response to injury.

The predisposing conditions described in the previous paragraph can serve to enhance the ability of the plasmablasts in PBL to: avoid the host's immune surveillance; survive for prolonged periods, grow excessively, and acquire pro-malignant gene abnormalities. Some of the gene abnormalities found in PBL include: 1) increased expression of the MYC proto-oncogene due to its rearrangement with an antibody gene by genetic recombination or, less commonly, other causes (Myc protein, the product of this gene, enhances cell proliferation, inhibits apoptosis, and promotes malignancy); 2) loss in the expression of the PRDM1 gene whose product, PRDM1/BLMP1 protein, represses the expression of Myc protein;) 3) frequent duplications in certain areas of chromosomes 1, 7, 11, and 22 (these duplications are similar to those often seen in diffuse large cell lymphoma); 4) reduced expression of at least 13 genes that are involved in B-cell responses to signaling agents. 5) increased expression of genes which promote the maturation of B-cells toward plasma cells (e.g. CD38, CD138, IR4/MUM1, XBP1, IL21R, and, as just indicated, PRDM1); and 6) reduced expression of genes characteristic of B-cells (e.g. CD20 and PAX5).

== Diagnosis ==
Microscopic examination of involved PBD masses and infiltrates generally reveals diffuse proliferations of immunoblast-like cells with prominent features of plasma cells, i.e. plasmablastic cells. Immunostaining of these cells indicate that they lack B-cell marker proteins (e.g. CD20 and PAX5 [in ~10% of cases CD20 may be expressed at very low levels]) but rather express plasma cell marker proteins (e.g. CD38, CD138, IR4/MUM1, XBP1, IL21R, and/or PRDM1). The abnormalities in gene structures and expressions reported in the Pathophysiology section, particularly rearrangement and/or over expression of the MYC proto-oncogene, may also be apparent in these cells. The presence of HIV/AIDS or other causes of immuno-incompetence (see previous section), a history of having a low-grade lymphoma, and/or the presence of EVB+ plasmablasts in the disease's lesions would support the diagnosis of PBL.

=== Differential diagnosis ===
Various lymphomas can exhibit the microscopic appearance, including plasmablastic cells, and presentation of PBL. These lymphomas can usually be differentiated from PBL by further examinations of the plasmablasts for various marker proteins and determining other factors that favor the diagnosis of these lymphomas rather than PBL, as indicated in the following descriptions.

==== Anaplastic lymphoma kinase-positive large B-cell lymphoma ====
Unlike PBL, the plasmablastic cells in anaplastic lymphoma kinase-positive large B-cell lymphoma strongly express the product of the ACVRL1 gene, i.e. activin receptor-like kinase 1 (ALK1) and are not infected with EBV and therefore do not express this virus's EBER or BART RNAs.

==== Human herpesvirus 8-positive diffuse large B-cell lymphoma, not otherwise specified ====
Unlike PBL, the plasmablastic cells in human herpesvirus 8-positive diffuse large B-cell lymphoma, not otherwise specified express products of herpesvirus 8 (also termed Kaposi sarcoma virus) such as LANA-1 protein. Also unlike PBL, these plasmablastic cells do not express CD30, CD138, CD79a, or a clonal IgM antibody and usually are not EBV-infected and therefore usually do not express this virus's EBER or BART RNAs.

==== Primary effusion lymphoma ====
In contrast to PBL, the plasmablastic cells in primary effusion lymphomas, whether HHV8-positive or HHV8-negative, usually strongly express CD45 and in HHV8 cases express HHV8 proteins such as the LANA-1 protein. Primary effusion lymphoma, HH8-negative also differs from PBL in that its plasmablastic cells frequently express certain B-cell marker proteins such as CD20 and CD79a.

==== Plasmablastic plasma cell lymphoma ====
Various factors distinguish plasmablastic plasma cell lymphoma from PBL. Prior diagnosis of plasma cell lymphoma (i.e. multiple myeloma or plasmacytoma), the presence of lytic bone lesions, increased levels of serum calcium, renal insufficiency, and anemia, and the presence of a myeloma protein in the serum and/or urine favor the diagnosis of plasmablastic plasma cell lymphoma rather than plasmablastic lymphoma. Ultimately, however, the marker proteins expressed by the plasmablastic cells in the two diseases are almost identical and a diagnosis of "plasmablastic neoplasm, consistent with PBL or multiple myeloma" may be acceptable in some cases according to the current World Health Organization classification.

==== Other B-cell lymphomas ====
The plasmablastic cells in B-cell lymphomas, including diffuse B-cell lymphomas, chronic lymphocytic leukemia/small lymphocytic lymphoma, and follicular lymphoma generally express CD20 and often express CD45 marker proteins. While PBL plasmablastic cells weakly express CD20 in 10% of cases, the strong expression of CD20 and the expression of CD45 virtually rules out PBL.

== Treatment ==
The treatments for PBL have ranged from radiotherapy for localized disease to various chemotherapy regimens for extensive disease. The chemotherapy regimens have included CHOP (i.e. cyclophosphamide, hydroxydoxorubicin (or doxorubicin), vincristine, and either prednisone or prednisolone); CHOP-like regimens (e.g. CHOP plus etoposide); hyper-CVAD-MA (i.e. cyclophosphamide, vincristine, doxorubicin, dexamethasone and high dose methotrexate and cytarabine); CODOX-M/IVAC (i.e. cyclophosphamide, vincristine, doxorubicin, high-dose methotrexate and ifosfamide, etoposide, and high-dose cytarabine); COMB (i.e. cyclophosphamide, oncovin, methyl-CCNU, and bleomycin); and infusional EPOCH (i.e. etoposide, prednisone, vincristine, cyclophosphamide, and doxorubicin). While the experience treating PBL with radiation alone has been limited, patients with localized disease have been treated with doxorubicin-based chemotherapy regimens plus radiotherapy.

=== Experimental treatments ===
Given the unsatisfactory results of standard chemotherapy regimens, new treatments are being explored for use in PBL. Bortezomib, a drug that inhibits proteasomes, has been used alone or in combination with radiation and/or CHOP, EPOCH, or THP-COP (pirarubicin, cyclophosphamide, vincristine, and prednisone) chemotherapy regimens to treat some scores of patients with newly diagnosed or relapsed PBL. The results of these exploratory studies have been at least modestly encouraging and provide strong support for further studies using more controlled conditions. A study sponsored by the AIDS Malignancy Consortium in collaboration with the National Cancer Institute is in its recruiting phase to study the dosages, safety, and efficacy of adding daratumumab to the EPOCH regimen in treating patients with PBL. Daratumumab is a prepared monoclonal antibody that binds to CD38 and thereby directly or indirectly kills cells, including the plasmablasts in PBL, that express this marker protein on their surfaces. An ongoing study sponsored by the City of Hope Medical Center is examining the feasibility and safety of gene therapy that uses recombinant RNA to target a key element in the HIV genome in patients who have HIV/AIDs and a non-Hodgkins lymphoma, including patients with plasmablastic lymphoma.

== Prognosis ==
Overall, patients receiving one of the cited chemotherapy regimens have achieved disease-free survival and overall survival rates of 22 and 32 months, respectively. The National Comprehensive Cancer Network recommends the more intensive regimens (e.g. hyper-CVAD-MA or infusional EPOCH) to treat the disease. These regimens have attained 5 year overall and disease-free survivals of 38% and 40%, respectively. Too few patients have been treated with autologous hematopoietic stem cell transplant in addition to chemotherapy for conclusions to be made. A few patients with HIV/AIDS-related PBL disease who were treated with highly active antiretroviral therapy (HAART) directed against the human immunodeficiency virus (i.e. HIV) have had remissions in their PDL lesions.

== History ==
A study by Green and Eversole published in 1989 reported on 9 individuals afflicted with HIV/AIDS who presented with lymphomatous masses in the oral cavity; these lymphomas were populated by apparently malignant Epstein–Barr virus-infected plasmablasts that did not express T-cell lymphocyte marker proteins. Eight years later, Delecluse and colleagues described a lymphoma, which they termed plasmablastic lymphoma, that had some features of a diffuse large B-cell lymphoma but unlike this lymphoma developed exclusively in the oral cavity, consisted of plasmablasts that lacked B-cell as well as T cell marker proteins and, in 15 of 16 cases, were infected with EBV. In 2008, the World Health Organization recognized this lymphoma as a variant of the diffuse large cell lymphomas. Subsequent to this recognition, numerous studies found this lymphoma to occur in a wide range of tissues besides the oral cavity and in individuals with various other predisposing immunodeficiency conditions. In 2017, this Organization classified PBL as the most common member of a rare subgroup of lymphomas termed lymphoid neoplasms with plasmablastic differentiation.

== See also ==
- Lymphoma
- Epstein–Barr virus–associated lymphoproliferative diseases
