= Mixed-cell lymphoma =

- Specialty: Oncology

Mixed-cell lymphomas are lymphomas that have both large cells and small cells in them. This nomenclature is derived from an older system of pathology, before technological advances allowed much more precise descriptions of the affected cancerous cells.

In MeSH, the phrase "mixed-cell lymphoma" is currently classified under non-Hodgkin lymphoma.

== See also ==
- Pleomorphism (cytology) – cells of different sizes and shapes
