= Primary effusion lymphoma =

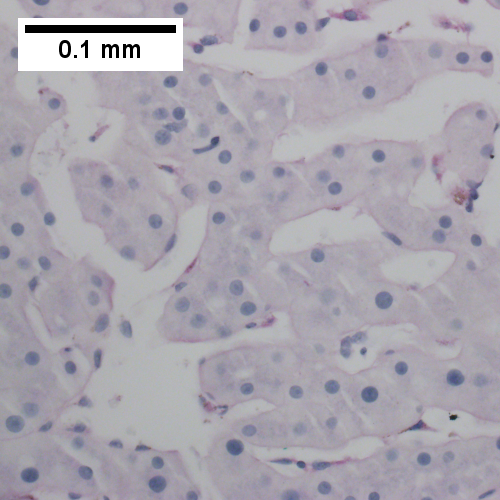
- Specialty: Hematology, oncology, virology
- Causes: Chronic viral infection with KSHV/HHV8 or HIV
- Prognosis: Guarded

Primary effusion lymphoma (PEL) is classified as a diffuse large B cell lymphoma. It is a rare malignancy of plasmablastic cells that occurs in individuals that are infected with the Kaposi's sarcoma-associated herpesvirus (i.e. KSHV/HHV8). Plasmablasts are immature plasma cells, i.e. lymphocytes of the B-cell type that have differentiated into plasmablasts but because of their malignant nature do not differentiate into mature plasma cells but rather proliferate excessively and thereby cause life-threatening disease. In PEL, the proliferating plasmablastoid cells commonly accumulate within body cavities to produce effusions (i.e. accumulations of fluid), primarily in the pleural, pericardial, or peritoneal cavities, without forming a contiguous tumor mass. In rare cases of these cavitary forms of PEL, the effusions develop in joints, the epidural space surrounding the brain and spinal cord, and underneath the capsule (i.e. tightly woven collagen fibers) which forms around breast implants. Less frequently, individuals present with extracavitary primary effusion lymphomas, i.e., solid tumor masses not accompanied by effusions. The extracavitary tumors may develop in lymph nodes, bone, bone marrow, the gastrointestinal tract, skin, spleen, liver, lungs, central nervous system, testes, paranasal sinuses, muscle, and, rarely, inside the vasculature and sinuses of lymph nodes. As their disease progresses, however, individuals with the classical effusion-form of PEL may develop extracavitary tumors and individuals with extracavitary PEL may develop cavitary effusions.

PEL typically occurs in individuals who are immunocompromised, i.e., individuals whose immune system is weakened and therefore less able to fight infectious agents and cancers. This weakening is ascribed to KSHV/HHV8 infection that is commonly further promoted by concurrent human immunodeficiency virus (i.e. HIV) infection, prior organ transplantation, the decline in immunity that develops with aging, and/or cirrhosis of the liver due to hepatitis B or C virus. The plasmacytoid cells in PEL are also commonly infected with the Epstein-Barr virus (i.e. EBV). EBV is a known cause of various Epstein-Barr virus-associated lymphoproliferative diseases including various B-cell lymphomas. However, the role of this virus in the development of PEL is not clear, although some studies suggest that EBV infection cooperates with KSHV/HHV8 infection to promote the development and/or progression of this disease.

Formally, PEL is defined by the World Health Organization, 2016 as a KSHV/HHV8-positive and KSHV/HHV8-driven large B-cell lymphoma. This lymphoma also belongs to a group of lymphoid neoplasms with plasmablastic differentiation that involve malignant plasmablasts but differ from PEL in the types of tissues where they accumulate, the gene abnormalities they carry, and/or the predisposing conditions involved in their development. More than 50, 30, and 60% of all PEL cases, respectively, develop in individuals who already have KSHV/HHV8-positive Kaposi's sarcoma, human herpesvirus 8-associated multicentric Castleman disease, and/or (especially in HIV-positive individuals) evidence of bearing EBV-infected plasmablasts.

Primary effussion lymphoma is an extremely aggressive cancer that is highly resistant to various chemotherapy treatments. It has carried a median survival time of ~5 months, with overall survival rates at 1, 3, and 5 years of only 30, 18, and 17%, respectively. In many cases, however, this high mortality reflects, at least in part, the lethality of its underlying predisposing diseases, particularly HIV/AIDS in HIV-infected individuals. New treatment strategies, including those directed at its underlying predisposing diseases, may improve the prognosis of PEL.

== Presentation ==
Individuals diagnosed with PEL most commonly (>33% of all cases) present with advanced Stage III or IV disease. They are predominately males with a median age of 42 years if they are infected with HIV and 73 years if they are not so infected. Some one-third to one-half of these individuals have a history of Kaposi's sarcoma, less commonly of multicentric Castleman disease, and/or rarely of immune deficiency due to organ transplantation, hepatitis complicated by cirrhosis caused by hepatitis B or C viral infection, or of old age. PEL occurring in the elderly generally occurs in EBV-negative individuals residing in the Mediterranean region. Individuals with the cavitary form of PEL present with symptoms due to effusions in the pleural cavity (e.g. shortness of breath), pericardium (e.g. chest pain/discomfort, hypotension, shortness of breath), peritoneal cavity (e.g. abdominal swelling), or, much less often, joints (e.g. swelling), the epidural space (e.g. central nervous system symptoms), or breast implants (e.g. breast swelling/pain/malformation). While most cases of classical PEL involve one cavitary site, some individuals present with two or more sites of cavitary involvement. Individuals with extracavitary PEL present with lesions in the lung, central nervous system, gastrointestinal tract, and/or lymph nodes. Gastrointestinal track lesions often occur as multiple lymphoid polyps in the large intestine. At diagnosis, more than 50% of individuals afflicted with either cavitary or extracavitary PEL have or report a history of B symptoms (i.e. fever, weight loss, night sweat). Laboratory examination in all PEL cases often show anemia, low blood levels of platelets, high serum levels of IL6, and high levels of circulating KSHV/HHV8.

== Pathophysiology ==
PEL develops in patients that have predisposing diseases that reduce the immune systems ability to attack precancerous and cancerous cells. Initially, KSHV/HHV8 viruses infect plasmablasts to establish a latency state in which the viruses express malignancy-promoting genes (see KSHV/HHV8 genes). Products of these viral genes include: 1) LANA-1, which inhibits host cells' p53 protein thereby reducing these cells' apoptosis (i.e. programmed cell death) response to injury, and also inhibits the activity of host cells' retinoblastoma protein thereby increasing these cells' proliferation; 2) vcylin, an analog of host cell cyclin, which binds RB to increase these cells' proliferation; 3) vFLIP, which inhibits host cell's apoptosis and activates these cells' NF-κB signaling pathway to prolong their survival; 4) various protein isoforms of kaposin which stimulate host cells to release cytokines (e.g., GM-CSF and IL-6) that act back on these cells to stimulate their growth; 5) vIL6, a viral analog of host cells' IL-6 which, while not often expressed, induces these cells to produce VEGF, a cytokine that feeds back on these cells to inhibit their apoptosis and to increase the permeability of nearby blood vessels thereby promoting the formation of effusions; 6) K1 protein which promotes the malignancy of host cells; 7) G-protein coupled receptor protein which promotes host cells' proliferation and survival; and 8) several viral microRNAs that promote host cells to proliferate, inhibit these cells' apoptosis, and stimulate the vascularization of nearby small blood vessel to promote effusions. While HIV/AIDS is associated with a wide range of cancers, including those involving B-cells such as plasmablastic lymphoma, the development of these cancers is commonly attributed to co-infection with oncogenic viruses (e.g. KSHV/HHV8, EBV): the direct role of HIV/AIDS in promoting PEL is unclear. Finally, some studies suggest that EBV cooperates with KSHV/HHV8 to cause PEL, perhaps by enhancing the ability of KSHV/HHV8 to establish their pro-malignant latency phase in infected cells.

As a probable result of their excessive proliferation, prolonged survival, and ability to avoid attack by a weakened immune system, the malignant cells in PEL exhibit a high degree of genomic instability, i.e. alterations in the structure and/or expression of their genetic material which are associated with the development and/or progression of PEL. These alterations include mutations (i.e. changes in nucleic acid sequences), chromosomal rearrangements (i.e. deletions, duplications, inversions, translocations), aneuploidy (i.e. increases or decreases in the number of chromosomes), and the abnormal expression of genes that may or may not be a result of the preceding structural gene changes. Potentially important examples include: 1) overexpression of the APOBEC3B gene whose protein product (termed "probable DNA dC->dU-editing enzyme APOBEC-3B") contributes to the regulation of cell growth; 2) missense mutations in the IRAK1 gene which causes overactivation of its product protein, interleukin-1 receptor-associated kinase 1, and thereby overactivation of the NF-κB signaling pathway that regulates cell proliferation and survival; 3) overexpression of the AQP3 gene whose protein product, aquaporin 3, is a water channel that when overexpressed is thought to promote the progression and spread of various types of cancers; 4) overexpression of the P-selectin glycoprotein ligand-1 gene whose protein product promotes cell attachment to vascular endothelium; 5) overexpression of the MUC1 gene whose product, the Mucin 1, cell surface associated protein, binds with P53 to inhibit cell death and interacts with beta-catenin to promote the tissue-invasiveness of cancer cells; and 6) overexpression of the MYC gene, whose product, c-Myc, is the cancer-causing MYC proto-oncogene although this overexpression, unlike the c-Myc overexpression occurring in other B-cell lymphomas, is usually not associated with structural abnormalities in its gene but rather is often overexpressed due to the action of the LANA-1 protein made by KSHV/HHV8. The identification of these changes in tissue samples can assist in making the diagnosis of PEL.

== Diagnosis ==
In classical cavitary cases, the diagnosis of PEL may be suspected based on its presentation as effusions in one or more bodily cavities in individuals with a history of the immunodeficiencies cited above. The diagnosis is supported by microscopic examination of cytologic smears taken from these effusions. These smears typically show plasmablasts and, in some cases, other malignant cells that have the morphology of anaplastic cells (i.e., large pleomorphic cells) or the Reed-Sternberg cells associated with Hodgkin disease. As detected by immunostaining methods, the malignant cells typically express molecular marker proteins such as CD45 (which is not expressed on mature plasma cells) as well as activation and plasma cell marker proteins such as CD30, MUC1, CD38, syndecan 1, and IRF4/MUM1; they do not express B-cell molecular marker proteins such as PAX5, CD19, CD29, or CD79a. The cells may also express many of the structural and non-structural gene abnormalities cited in the Pathophysiology section. By definition, individuals with PEL are infected by Kaposi's sarcoma-associated herpesvirus (HHV-8 or KSHV/HHV8) and therefore evidence malignant cells that express products of this virus such as LANA1. In most cases, these individuals are also infected with EBV and therefore evidence malignant cells that express products of this virus such as EBER1/2 nuclear RNA's. Cases associated with HIV/AIDS test positive for antibodies directed against this virus. (PEL occurs in the absence of HHV-8 and HIV, although this is rare.) Individuals with PEL that is associated with cirrhosis due to hepatitis evidence positive serum tests for the hepatitis virus B antigen (HBsAg) or one of the various tests for hepatitis C antigen. Extracavitary PEL is diagnosed based on findings that their mass lesions contain the same or very similar types of malignant cells and the same set of blood and serum findings as those that are found in cavitary PEL.

== KSHV/HHV8-negative primary effusion lymphoma ==
Effusion-based lymphoma, KSHV/HHV8-negative (also termed Type II PEL) has been described by some researchers. These cases closely resemble KSHV/HHV8-positive (also termed Type I PEL) but have yet to be defined by the World Health Organization (2017). Compared to Type I PEL, Type II PEL occurs more often in older individuals, is less often associated with EBV, and more often afflicts individuals who lack evidence of being immunocompromised. That is, the majority of HHV-8-negative EBL cases do not evidence a potentially PEL causative agent, such as HIV, EBV, HCV, or iatrogenic immunodeficiency, except for old age and, in 20% to 40% of cases, the presence of hepatitis C virus infection. Type II PEL also tends to involve malignant plasmablasts, anaplastic cells, and/or Reed-Sternberg-like cells that have somewhat different expression patters of protein markers (e.g. the malignant cells in Type II PEL frequently express CD20 but often do not express CD30) and gene abnormalities (e.g. the malignant cells in Type II PEL more commonly evidence rearrangements in their Myc, BCL2, and BCL6 genes) than the malignant cells in Type I PEL. The response to treatment and prognosis of Type II PEL is poor but may be somewhat better than the treatment-responsiveness and prognosis of Type I PEL. One factor that appears to improve the treatment of Type II PEL is the addition of rituximab (a monoclonal antibody directed against and killing CD20-bearing cell) to the intensive chemotherapy regimens used to treat Type I PEL: the malignant cells in Type II PEL commonly express CD20 whereas the malignant cells in Type I PEL rarely express this cell surface marker. However, there are several cases of KSHV/HHV8-negative EBL that presented with pericardial effusions without evidence of more extensive disease that have experienced complete responses and favorable prognoses without chemotherapy or other cancer treatment (including rituximab) after simple drainage of the effusion. These cases suggest that, in addition to the presence of rituximab-sensitive CD20-bearing malignant cells, Type II PEL may be a less severe disease than Type I PEL, at least in certain cases.

== Treatment ==
PEL is generally resistant to cancer chemotherapy drugs that are active against other B-cell lymphomas and therefore carries a poor prognosis. Overall median and 1-year survival rates in a series of 28 patients treated with chemotherapy for PEL were 6.2 months and 39.3%, respectively. In this study, the complete response rate (presumed to be temporary) to a standard CHOP chemotherapeutic regimen (i.e. cyclophosphamide doxorubicin, vincristine, and prednisone) was only 10% whereas a more intensive CHO chemotherapy regimen which included high dose methotrexate and bleomycin achieved a compete response rate (presumed temporary) of 70%. A second study using CHOP-like regimens or one of these regimens plus methotrexate also produced better results with the latter regimens: 5-year survival rates for the CHOP-like and CHOP-like plus methotrexate regimens were 34.4% and 45.7%, respectively. A review of 105 PEL cases reported median survival times, 1-year, 3-year, and 5-year survival rates of 4.8 months, 30%, 18%, and 17%, respectively. In this study, patients with advanced Ann Arbor Stage III or IV disease had a particularly poor survival rate at 1 year of 25%; this compared to a rate of 42% for patients with stage I or II disease.

Anti-viral drugs directed against Cytomegalovirus (i.e. cidofovir, ganciclovir, and valganciclovir) have been reported to produce complete presumed temporary responses in individual cases of PEL while drugs directed against HIV in patients with HIV+ PEL have achieved presumed temporary median response and 5-year survival rates of 0.7 months and 28%, respectively. The National Comprehensive Cancer Network (NCCN) guideline recommends treating HIV/AIDS-related PEL with antiviral therapy in combination with aggressive chemotherapy regimens such as DA-EPOCH, cyclophosphamide, doxorubicin, and etoposide, or CHOP. Rituximab, a monoclonal antibody directed against and killing CD20-expressing cells, appears to improve the efficacy of chemotherapy regimens in treating cases of PEL that evidence CD20-positive malignant cells such as Type II PEL. It has been suggested that regimens that include rituximab might improve the treatment of not only CD+ Type II PEL but also the uncommon cases of CD20+ Type I PEL and all cases of CD- PEL. The efficacy of rituximab in CD- PEL may be due to the ability of this antibody to kill non-malignant CD+ 20 lymphocytes and thereby their potential to promote the disease. A National Cancer Institute-sponsored clinical study is in its recruiting phase to study the efficacy of DA-EPOCH (which includes rituximab) plus lenalidomide in treating PEL. Current studies are also examining the effects of drug-based inhibition of the signaling pathways that are overactive in the malignant plasmablasts in PEL (see Pathophysiology section) for their therapeutic effectiveness.

== History ==
PEL was first described in 1989 as a malignant B cell-derived non-Hodgkin lymphoma that developed in three individuals afflicted with HIV/AIDS. In 1995, a group of researchers found DNA sequences that identified KSHV/HHV8 sequences in 8 lymphomas in the malignant cells of patients infected with the HIV; all 8 patients had effusions containing malignant cells in their pleural, pericardial, or peritoneal spaces and had malignant cells in their effusions that evidenced the Epstein-Barr viral genome. Nadir and colleagues termed this syndrome of findings pulmonary effusion lymphoma in 1996. During the years following these initial reports, several cases of PEL were found to be KSHV/HHV8-negative, i.e. occurring in individuals with no evidence of being infected with KSHV/HHV8, or to be manifested by solid tumors that were not associated with effusions, i.e. cases of extracavitary PEL.

== See also ==
- List of hematologic conditions
