= Lymphoid neoplasms with plasmablastic differentiation =

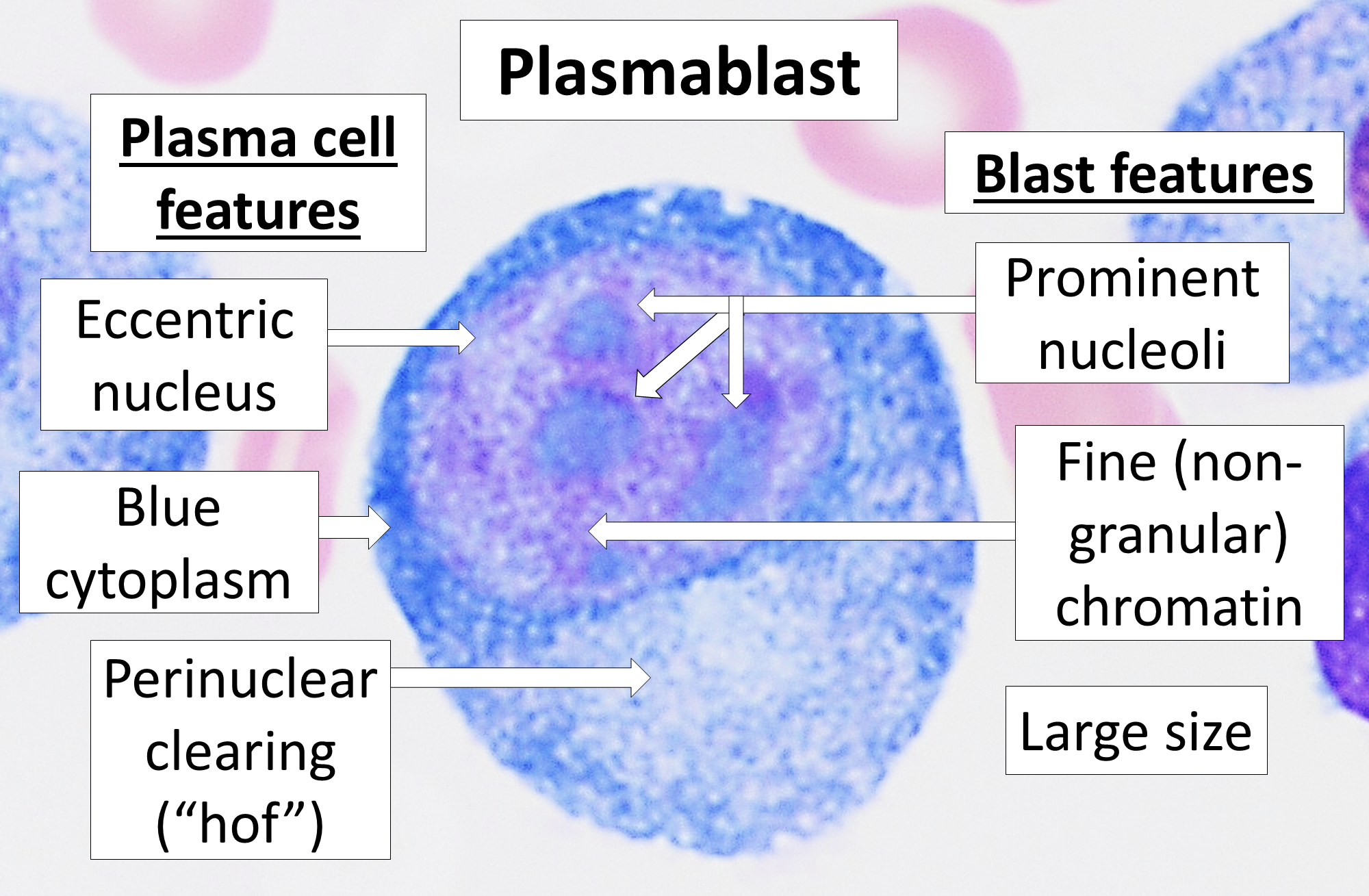
Plasmablast, Wright stain.

Lymphoid neoplasms with plasmablastic differentiation were classified by the World Health Organization, 2017 as a sub-grouping of several distinct but rare lymphomas in which the malignant cells are B-cell lymphocytes that have become plasmablasts, i.e. immature plasma cells. Normally, B-cells take up foreign antigens, move to the germinal centers of secondary lymphoid organs such the spleen and lymph nodes, and at these sites are stimulated by T-cell lymphocytes to differentiate (i.e. change their cell type) into plasmablasts and thereafter mature plasma cells. Plasmablasts, and to a greater extent, plasma cells make and secrete antibodies that bind the antigens to which their predecessor B-cells were previously exposed (see plasma cell differentiation). Antibodies function, in part, to neutralize harmful bacteria and viruses by binding antigens that are exposed on their surfaces. Due to their malignant nature, however, the plasmablasts in lymphoid neoplasms with plasmablastic differentiation do not mature into plasma cells or form antibodies but rather uncontrollably proliferate in and damage various tissues and organs. The individual lymphomas in this sub-group of malignancies have heterogeneous clinical, morphological, and gene findings that often overlap with other members of the sub-group. In consequence, correctly diagnosing these lymphomas has been challenging. Nonetheless, it is particularly important to diagnose them correctly because they often have very different prognoses and treatments. The lymphoid neoplasms with plasmacytic differentiation are:

- 1) Plasmablastic lymphoma: The most common of these lymphoid neoplasms.
- 2) Plasmablastic plasma cell lymphoma or plasmablastic plasmacytoma: A lymphoid neoplasm that disseminates widely like the plasma cell lesions in multiple myeloma or is localized like the plasma cell lesions in plasmacytoma.
- 3) Primary effusion lymphoma, human herpes virus-positive: Also termed primary effusion lymphoma, type I; it is usually characterized by manifesting effusions in body cavities.
- 4) Primary effusion lymphoma, human herpes virus-negative: Also termed primary effusion lymphoma, type II; it is characterized by having effusions in body cavities.
- 5) Anaplastic lymphoma kinase-positive large B-cell lymphoma: An anaplastic large cell lymphoma in which the malignant cells have plasmablastic features and a distinguishing mutation in the anaplastic lymphoma kinase gene.
- 6) Human herpesvirus 8-positive diffuse large B-cell lymphoma, not otherwise specified: This lymphoid neoplasm usually arises from the lymphoproliferative disease, idiopathic multicentric Castleman disease.

Except for human herpesvirus 8-positive diffuse large B-cell lymphoma, not otherwise specified, these lymphoid neoplasms are often associated with Epstein-Barr virus infection of the malignant plasmablastic cells. In cases so infected, the lymphoid neoplasm may result, at least in part, from this viral infection and therefore can be considered as examples of the Epstein-Barr virus-associated lymphoproliferative diseases.
