= Primrose syndrome =

Genetic disorder

- Other names: Intellectual disability-cataracts-calcified pinnae-myopathy syndrome
- Primrose syndrome is inherited via an autosomal dominant manner

Primrose syndrome is a rare, slowly progressive genetic disorder that can vary symptomatically between individual cases, but is generally characterised by ossification of the external ears, learning difficulties, and facial abnormalities. It was first described in 1982 in Scotland's Royal National Larbert Institution by Dr D.A.A. Primrose.

Primrose syndrome appears to occur spontaneously, regardless of family history. The cause is a mutation in the gene ZBTB20 and there are no known treatments.

== Signs and symptoms ==
The common symptoms in all reported cases of Primrose syndrome include ossified pinnae, learning disabilities or intellectual disability, hearing problems, movement disorders (ataxia, paralysis, and parkinsonism among others—likely due, in part, to calcification of the basal ganglia), a torus palatinus (a neoplasm on the mouth's hard palate), muscle atrophy, and distorted facial features. Other symptoms usually occur, different in each case, but it is unknown whether or not these symptoms are caused by the same disease.

== Pathophysiology ==
The cause of Primrose syndrome is a mutation in the gene ZBTB20. This condition is extremely rare and seems to spontaneously occur, regardless of family history.

In the case studied by Dalai et al. in 2010, it was found that an abnormally high amount of calcitonin, a hormone secreted by the thyroid gland to stabilize blood calcium levels, was present in the blood serum. This suggests that the thyroid gland is releasing an abnormal amount of calcitonin, resulting in the disruption of calcium level homeostasis. No molecular cause was found, but an expanded microarray analysis of the patient found a 225.5 kb deletion on chromosome 11p between rs12275693 and rs1442927. Whether or not this deletion is related to the syndrome or is a harmless mutation is unknown. The deletion was not present in the patient's mother's DNA sample, but the father's DNA was unavailable.

== Management ==
Management: Individualized educational support, speech, physical, and occupational therapy as needed. Behavioral concerns and associated medical conditions should be treated appropriately.

Surveillance: Monitor growth, development, speech, and behavior every six months. Assess for seizures and musculoskeletal complications at each visit. Perform annual hearing tests, blood glucose measurements, HbA1c testing, and screening for thyroid dysfunction.

== History ==
There have been very few reported cases of Primrose syndrome worldwide. The first known case was described by D.A. Primrose in 1982. The patient was a 33-year-old intellectually disabled male whose outer ears had ossified. Additional symptoms included muscle atrophy in the legs and hands, deafness, cataracts, and a tissue mass covering the roof of his mouth.

In 1986, Calacott et al. described a mentally disabled patient whose pinnae had ossified. The patient also experienced deafness, cataracts, skeletal deformities, and muscle atrophy. As the second reported case of such symptoms, it suggested that these symptoms were part of one entity, named "Primrose syndrome".

In 1996, Lindor et al. reported a 43-year-old male patient with schizophrenia, as well as other neurological disorders, and severe pinnae calcification. Additional symptoms included hearing loss, stiffened joints, and facial deformities.

In 2006, Mathijssen et al. described an adult male intellectually disabled patient who had calcified pinnae and a neoplasm of the palate. The patient also had extensive hearing loss, little to no body hair, distorted facial features, and joint contractures. The patient also developed testicular cancer, but it is unknown whether or not it is related to the syndrome. The patient experienced cryptorchidism, a birth defect where one of the testes is not present at birth; that may have played a part in the formation of the tumor.

In 2010, another similar case was studied extensively by Dalal et al. The patient was an intellectual disabled 43-year-old woman who had hearing impairment, distorted facial features, muscle atrophy, cataracts, and ossification of cartilage. Additionally, she was born with Ebstein malformation, a congenital heart defect, agenesis of the corpus callosum, and hip dysplasia. Other symptoms included hypothyroidism, diabetes, and muscle control problems. A brain MRI showed that her basal ganglia had partially calcified, which may have contributed to her paraparesis and motor tics.

== See also ==
- Calcinosis
- Fahr's syndrome
- Muscular atrophy
