= Mir-BART2 microRNA precursor family =

mir-BART2 microRNA precursor family
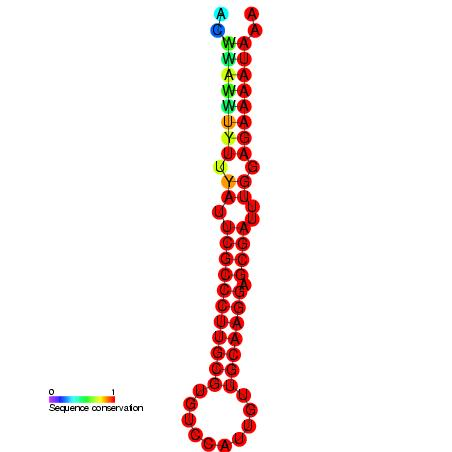
- Predicted secondary structure and sequence conservation of mir-BART2

Identifiers
- Symbol: mir-BART2
- Rfam: RF00364
- miRBase: MI0001068

Other data
- RNA type: Gene; miRNA
- Domain(s): Viruses
- GO: GO:0035195 GO:0035068
- SO: SO:0001244
- PDB structures: PDBe

The mir-BART2 microRNA precursor found in Human herpesvirus 4 (Epstein–Barr virus) and Cercopithicine herpesvirus 15. mir-BART2 is expressed in all stages of infection but expression is significantly elevated in the lytic stage. In Epstein-Barr virus, mir-BART2 is found in the intronic regions of the BART (Bam HI-A region rightward transcript) gene whose function is unknown. mir-BART2 is thought to target the virally encoded DNA polymerase BALF5 for degradation. The mature sequence is excised from the 5' arm of the hairpin.
