= ZBTB20 =

Human protein-coding gene

Identifiers
- Aliases: ZBTB20, DPZF, HOF, ODA-8S, ZNF288, PRIMS, zinc finger and BTB domain containing 20
- External IDs: OMIM: 606025; MGI: 1929213; GeneCards: ZBTB20

Gene location (Human)
Chr.	Chromosome 3 (human)
Band	3q13.31	Start	114,314,500 bp
Band	3q13.31	End	115,147,288 bp

Gene location (Mouse)
Chr.	Chromosome 16 (mouse)
Band	16 B4|16 28.44 cM	Start	42,875,881 bp
Band	16 B4|16 28.44 cM	End	43,642,602 bp
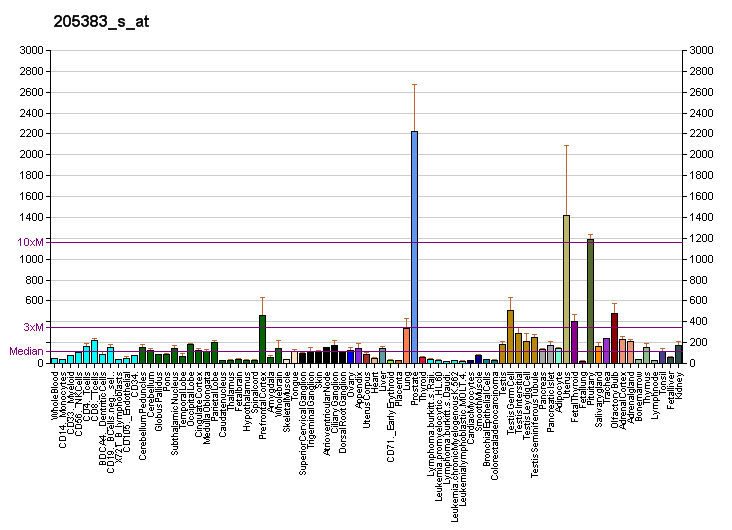
RNA expression pattern
Bgee	Human / Mouse (ortholog); Top expressed in: corpus epididymis; caput epididymis; tail of epididymis; renal medulla; corpus callosum; Achilles tendon; Skeletal muscle tissue of biceps brachii; external globus pallidus; trigeminal ganglion; glutes / Top expressed in: Rostral migratory stream; vestibular membrane of cochlear duct; utricle; median eminence; arcuate nucleus; ciliary body; aortic valve; ascending aorta; tunica media of zone of aorta; retinal pigment epithelium; More reference expression data
BioGPS	More reference expression data
Gene ontology
Molecular function	nucleic acid binding; DNA binding; DNA-binding transcription repressor activity, RNA polymerase II-specific; metal ion binding; DNA-binding transcription factor activity, RNA polymerase II-specific
Cellular component	nucleus; nucleoplasm; nuclear body; cytoplasm
Biological process	positive regulation of tumor necrosis factor production; negative regulation of transcription, DNA-templated; regulation of transcription, DNA-templated; negative regulation of transcription by RNA polymerase II; negative regulation of gene expression; transcription, DNA-templated; positive regulation of interleukin-6 production; positive regulation of interferon-beta production; positive regulation of glycolytic process; positive regulation of lipid biosynthetic process; lipid homeostasis; cellular response to glucose stimulus
Sources:Amigo / QuickGO
Orthologs
Databases	NCBI: entry; OMA: entry
Species	Human	Mouse
Entrez	26137	56490
Ensembl	ENSG00000181722	ENSMUSG00000022708
UniProt	Q9HC78	Q8K0L9
RefSeq (mRNA)	NM_001164342; NM_001164343; NM_001164344; NM_001164345; NM_001164346 NM_001164347; NM_015642; NM_001348800; NM_001348802; NM_001348803; NM_001348804; NM_001348805; NM_001348801; NM_001393393; NM_001393394; NM_001393395; NM_001393396	NM_001285805; NM_019778; NM_181058
RefSeq (protein)	NP_001157814; NP_001157815; NP_001157816; NP_001157817; NP_001157818 NP_001157819; NP_056457; NP_001335729; NP_001335731; NP_001335732; NP_001335733; NP_001335734; NP_001335730	NP_001272734; NP_062752; NP_851401; NP_001380326; NP_001380327 NP_001380328
Location (UCSC)	Chr 3: 114.31 – 115.15 Mb	Chr 16: 42.88 – 43.64 Mb
PubMed search
- Wikidata
View/Edit Human	View/Edit Mouse

Zinc finger and BTB domain-containing protein 20 is a protein that in humans is encoded by the ZBTB20 gene.

A mutation in a ZBTB20 gene causes Primrose syndrome.
