= KDM6B =

Protein-coding gene in humans

Identifiers
- Aliases: KDM6B, JMJD3, lysine demethylase 6B, NEDCFSA
- External IDs: OMIM: 611577; MGI: 2448492; GeneCards: KDM6B
Available structures
PDB	Ortholog search: PDBe RCSB
PDB	List of PDB id codes 2XUE, 2XXZ, 4ASK, 5FP3
Enzyme activity
EC #	BRENDA	ExPASy	KEGG	MetaCyc
1.14.11.68	↗	↗	↗	↗

Gene location (Human)
Chr.	Chromosome 17 (human)
Band	17p13.1	Start	7,834,217 bp
Band	17p13.1	End	7,854,796 bp

Gene location (Mouse)
Chr.	Chromosome 11 (mouse)
Band	11|11 B3	Start	69,398,508 bp
Band	11|11 B3	End	69,413,675 bp
RNA expression pattern
Bgee	Human / Mouse (ortholog); Top expressed in: blood; sural nerve; granulocyte; epithelium of colon; mucosa of ileum; left ovary; right ovary; ganglionic eminence; anterior pituitary; left uterine tube / Top expressed in: internal carotid artery; Rostral migratory stream; external carotid artery; otolith organ; utricle; hand; secondary oocyte; vestibular membrane of cochlear duct; primitive streak; hair follicle; More reference expression data
BioGPS	n/a
Gene ontology
Molecular function	sequence-specific DNA binding; beta-catenin binding; chromatin binding; dioxygenase activity; metal ion binding; protein binding; oxidoreductase activity; histone demethylase activity; histone H3-tri/di-methyl-lysine-27 demethylase activity; RNA polymerase II cis-regulatory region sequence-specific DNA binding; chromatin DNA binding
Cellular component	nucleoplasm; nucleus; MLL3/4 complex
Biological process	response to fungicide; histone demethylation; cell fate commitment; inflammatory response to antigenic stimulus; cardiac muscle cell differentiation; response to activity; mesodermal cell differentiation; regulation of gene expression; endothelial cell differentiation; inflammatory response; hippocampus development; positive regulation of transcription by RNA polymerase II; cellular response to hydrogen peroxide; histone H3-K27 demethylation; chromatin remodeling; chromatin organization; positive regulation of cold-induced thermogenesis
Sources:Amigo / QuickGO
Orthologs
Databases	NCBI: entry; OMA: entry
Species	Human	Mouse
Entrez	23135	216850
Ensembl	ENSG00000132510	ENSMUSG00000018476
UniProt	O15054	Q5NCY0
RefSeq (mRNA)	NM_001080424; NM_001348716	NM_001017426
RefSeq (protein)	NP_001073893; NP_001335645	NP_001017426
Location (UCSC)	Chr 17: 7.83 – 7.85 Mb	Chr 11: 69.4 – 69.41 Mb
PubMed search
- Wikidata
View/Edit Human	View/Edit Mouse

Lysine demethylase 6B is a protein that in humans is encoded by the KDM6B (JMJD3) gene.

== Regulation during differentiation ==
KDM6B was found to be expressional increased during cardiac and endothelial differentiation of murine embryonic stem cells.

== Small molecule inhibition ==
A small molecule inhibitor (GSK-J1) has been developed to inhibit the jumonji domain of KDM6 histone demethylase family to modulate proinflammatory response in macrophages.

== Role in pathology ==
Mutations of the KDM6B gene may cause neurodevelopmental disorder with coarse facies and mild distal skeletal abnormalities, which was first described in 2019 by Stolerman et al.

Standard laboratory exome sequencing can be used to identify the KDM6B gene variant.

=== Clinical picture ===
A 2019 study on symptoms from KDM6B variations reported:

- Delays in speech and motor development
- Dysmorphic facial features including coarse features, a prominent forehead, broad mouth, large and prominent ears, a round face, prognathism, and epicanthal fold
- Musculoskeletal features including somewhat widened and thickened hands and fingers, joint hypermobility, clinodactyly of the fifth fingers, and toe syndactyly
- Neuromuscular hypotonia
- Intellectual disability
- Autism spectrum disorder

A further 2023 international study reported on the following clinical features among individuals with (likely) pathogenic KDM6B variants:

Feature Name	p value	Total %
Males	0.50	73%
Increased birth weight [>2 SD]	0.33	17%
Increased weight [>2 SD]	0.59	14%
Tall stature [>2 SD]	1.0	8%
Macrocephaly [>2 SD]	1.0	26%
At least one feature of overgrowth syndrome	1.0	30%
Language/speech delay	0.15	94%
Motor delay	1.0	89%
Intellectual disability	0.14	63%
Autism spectrum (ASD)	0.51	61%
Behavior problems, non-ASD	0.70	60%
Psychotic disorders [≥12 years old]	1.0	20%
Seizures	0.58	13%
Sleep disturbances	0.09	32%
Movement disorder/gait disturbances/hypertonia/ataxia	0.67	24%
Hypotonia	1.0	57%
Neonatal feeding difficulties or gastroesophageal reflux	1.0	51%
Constipation	1.0	18%
Congenital heart disease	0.58	13%
Cleft lip/palate/uvula	0.03b	4%
Genitourinary system abnormalities	1.0	10%
Joint hypermobility	1.0	42%
Scoliosis/kyphosis/lordosis	0.58	13%
Syndactyly	0.15	9%
Short fingers or toes	1.0	9%
Broad fingers/fingertips/hands/toes/feet	1.0	20%
Myopia/amblyopia	0.08	33%
Strabismus	0.58	13%
Hearing loss	1.0	2%
Recurrent ear infections	1.0	12%

=== Epidemiology ===
For patients reporting intellectual disability and/or developmental delay, approximately 0.12% have de novo alterations in the KDM6B gene.

=== Related conditions ===
Overlapping phenotypic features for patients between KDM6A associated with Kabuki syndrome and KDM6B variations include prominent ears, abnormal dentition, congenital heart disease, feeding difficulties, cryptorchidism, joint hyper-mobility, developmental delay, hypotonia, and behavioral difficulties.

== Ongoing research ==
According to a study published in 2022, pathologic mutations of KDM6B were found in five patients with cerebral folate deficiency.
