= Large-cell lymphoma =

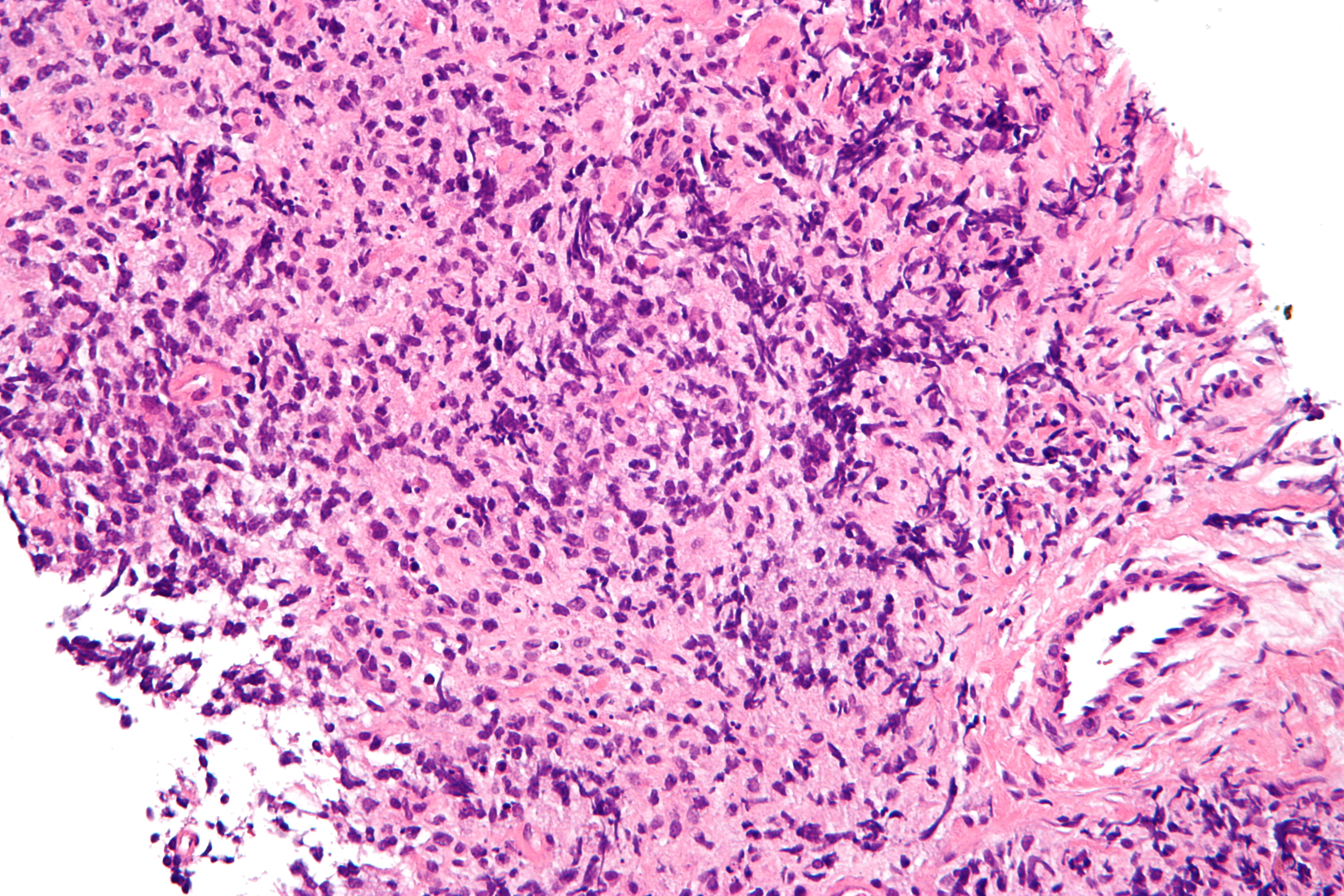
- Micrograph of a primary mediastinal large B-cell lymphoma, a type of large-cell lymphoma. H&E stain.
- Specialty: Oncology

The large-cell lymphomas have large cells. One classification system for lymphomas divides the diseases according to the size of the white blood cells that have turned cancerous. A large cell, in this context, has a diameter of 17 to 20 μm. Other groups of lymphomas in this system are the small-cell lymphomas and mixed-cell lymphomas.

== Types ==
=== B cell ===
Diffuse large B-cell lymphoma is the most common of the large-cell lymphomas. MeSH now classifies the phrase "large-cell lymphoma" under "Diffuse large B cell lymphoma".

Many other B-cell lymphomas feature large cells:

- Angiocentric lymphoma
- Burkitt's lymphoma
- Follicular large-cell lymphoma
- Immunoblastic lymphoma
- Intravascular large-cell lymphoma
- Primary mediastinal B-cell lymphoma
- T-cell–rich B-cell lymphoma
- Primary splenic lymphoma (rare)
- Primary central nervous system lymphomas, which are often diffuse large-B-cell lymphomas
- Richter's transformation: Diffuse Large B-cell Variant
- 1) ABC subtype (common)
- 2) GCB subtype (rare)

Activated B-Cell Diffuse Large B-Cell Lymphoma, or ABC-DLBCL, is believed to be caused by aberrant activation of a critical intracellular pathway. This intracellular signaling pathway involved in B-cell activation and proliferation stays constantly activated, driving lymphocytes to proliferate continuously. The inhibition of this pathway can be induced by a drug known as NEMO Binding Domain, or NBD, a peptide causing increased cell death of malignant lymphocytes.

=== T cell ===
Less commonly, a large-cell lymphoma may feature T cells. Anaplastic large-cell lymphoma is an example of a large-cell lymphoma that involves T cells. Of the large-cell T-cell lymphomas, it has the best prognosis.
